= Hfq binding sRNA =

isrA Hfq binding RNA
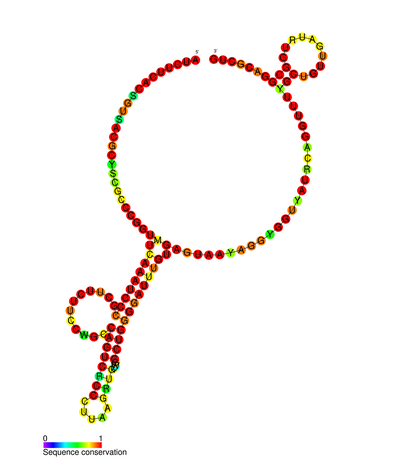
- Predicted secondary structure of isrA Hfq binding RNA

Identifiers
- Symbol: isrA
- Rfam: RF01385

Other data
- RNA type: gene, sRNA
- Domain: Enterobacteriaceae
- PDB structures: PDBe

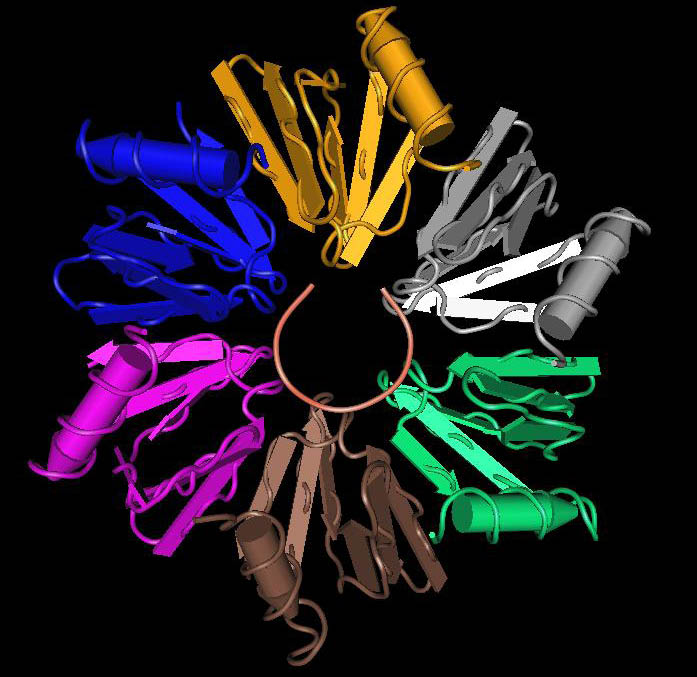
Hfq protein from S. aureus with a bound sRNA.

An Hfq binding sRNA is an sRNA that binds the bacterial RNA binding protein called Hfq. A number of bacterial small RNAs which have been shown to bind to Hfq have been characterised (see list). Many of these RNAs share a similar structure composed of three stem-loops. Several studies have expanded this list, and experimentally validated a total of 64 Hfq binding sRNA in Salmonella Typhimurium. A transcriptome wide study on Hfq binding sites in Salmonella mapped 126 Hfq binding sites within sRNAs. Genomic SELEX has been used to show that Hfq binding RNAs are enriched in the sequence motif 5′-AAYAAYAA-3′. Genome-wide study identified 40 candidate Hfq-dependent sRNAs in plant pathogen Erwinia amylovora. 12 of them were confirmed by Northern blot.

== Bacterial Hfq binding sRNAs ==
- DicF RNA
- DsrA RNA
- FnrS RNA
- GadY RNA
- GcvB RNA
- IsrJ RNA
- MicA RNA / SraD RNA
- MicC RNA
- MicF RNA
- OmrA RNA / OmrB RNA / RygA RNA / RygB RNA / SraE RNA
- OxyS RNA
- Qrr RNA
- RmA RNA
- RprA RNA
- RybB RNA
- RydC RNA
- RyeB RNA
- CyaR RNA
- RyeF
- RyhB RNA
- SgrS RNA
- Spot 42 RNA
- SraH RNA
- SraJ RNA
- SroB RNA / MicM RNA / RybC
- SroC RNA
