= ArcZ RNA =

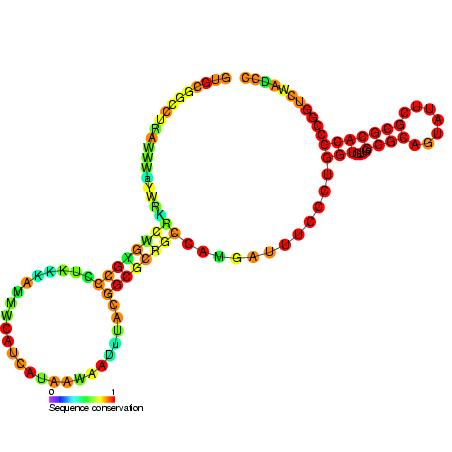
- Predicted secondary structure and sequence conservation of ArcZ RNA

Identifiers
- Symbol: ArcZ RNA
- Rfam: RF00081

Other data
- RNA type: Gene; sRNA
- Domain: Bacteria
- SO: SO:0000655
- PDB structures: PDBe

In molecular biology the ArcZ RNA (also known as RyhA and SraH) is a small non-coding RNA (ncRNA). It is the functional product of a gene which is not translated into protein. ArcZ is an Hfq binding RNA that functions as an antisense regulator of a number of protein coding genes.

== Discovery ==
This non-coding RNA was discovered in the bacteria Escherichia coli during a large scale computational screen for transcription signals and genomic features of known small RNA-encoding genes. During this screen 14 novel ncRNA genes were identified, including GlmZ, SraB, SraC and SraD. The expression of SraH was experimentally confirmed by Northern blotting. Its expression is highly abundant in stationary growth phase but low levels of expression can still be detected in exponentially growing cells.

== Processing ==
Although ArcZ is initially transcribed as a transcript of ~120 nucleotides. This precursor is unstable and is processed into an abundant fragment ~58 nucleotides which represents the 3' end of the initial transcript. The stability and abundance of the shorter 3' transcript is confirmed in both Northern blotting and deep sequencing analysis.

== Function ==
ArcZ has been shown to strongly bind the global post-transcriptional regulator protein Hfq. In Salmonella it has been shown to repress the expression of protein coding genes sdaCB (involved in serine uptake) and tpx (involved in oxidative stress) genes, and of the horizontally acquired gene methyl-accepting chemotaxis protein (MCP). Both sdaCB and STM3216 are regulated by ArcZ binding the ribosome binding site, the tpx mRNA is targeted in the coding sequence (CDS). ArcZ positively stimulates expression of RpoS stationary phase sigma factor. In plant pathogen Erwinia amylovora ArcZ was shown to positively control the type III secretion system (T3SS), amylovoran exopolysaccharide production, biofilm formation, and bacterial motility, but it negatively regulates bacterial attachment.

== Regulation ==
ArcZ is negatively regulated by the ArcB/ArcA two component regulators. ArcA represses arcZ anaerobically but not aerobically.
