= SraG RNA =

Key like functional RNA

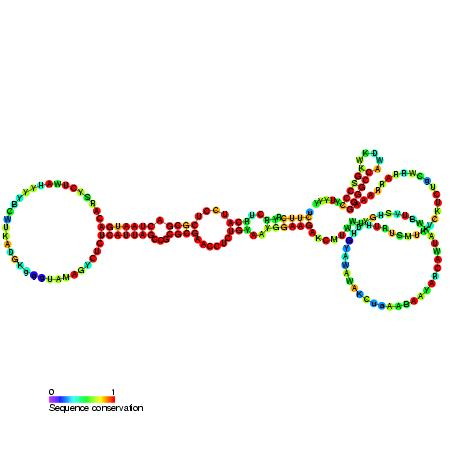
- Predicted secondary structure and sequence conservation of SraG

Identifiers
- Symbol: SraG
- Rfam: RF00082

Other data
- RNA type: Gene; sRNA
- Domain: Bacteria
- SO: SO:0000655
- PDB structures: PDBe

SraG (small RNA G) is a small non-coding RNA (ncRNA). It is the functional product of a gene which is not translated into protein.

This ncRNA was discovered in the bacteria Escherichia coli during a large scale computational screen for transcription signals and genomic features of known small RNA-encoding genes. During this screen 14 novel ncRNA genes were identified, including GlmZ, SraB, SraC and SraD.

The expression of SraG was experimentally confirmed by Northern blotting which also indicated this RNA undergoes specific cleavage processing. The function of this RNA is unknown.
