= H2cR sRNA =

In molecular biology, the h2cR sRNA is a small RNA produced by species of the bacterial genus Burkholderia. It binds to the 5'UTR of mRNA encoding the hfq2 chaperone protein. Binding of this sRNA to the hfq2 mRNA results in accelerated decay of the mRNA.

== See also ==
- Bacterial small RNA
- Hfq binding sRNA
