= C0465 RNA =

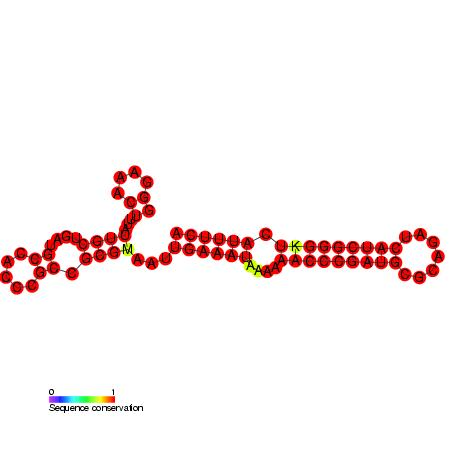
- Predicted secondary structure and sequence conservation of C0465

Identifiers
- Symbol: C0465
- Rfam: RF00116

Other data
- RNA type: Gene; sRNA
- Domain(s): Bacteria
- SO: SO:0000655
- PDB structures: PDBe

The C0465 RNA is a bacterial non-coding RNA of 78 nucleotides in length that is found between the tar and cheW genes in the genomes of Escherichia coli and Shigella flexneri. This ncRNA was originally identified in E. coli using high-density oligonucleotide probe arrays (microarray). The function of this ncRNA is unknown.

== See also ==
- C0299 RNA
- C0343 RNA
- C0719 RNA
