= RydC RNA =

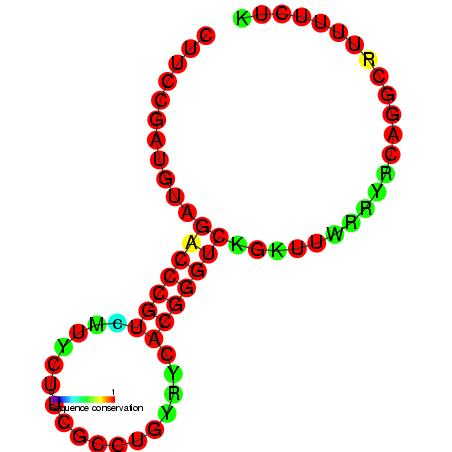
- Predicted secondary structure and sequence conservation of RydC

Identifiers
- Symbol: RydC
- Rfam: RF00505

Other data
- RNA type: Gene; sRNA
- Domain(s): Bacteria
- SO: SO:0000655
- PDB structures: PDBe

RydC is a bacterial non-coding RNA. RydC is thought to regulate a mRNA, yejABEF, which encodes an ABC transporter protein. RydC is known to bind the Hfq protein, which causes a conformational change in the RNA molecule. The Hfq/RydC complex is then thought to bind to the target mRNA and induce its degradation.

== See also ==
- RyfA RNA
- RydB RNA
- RybB RNA
