= C0719 RNA =

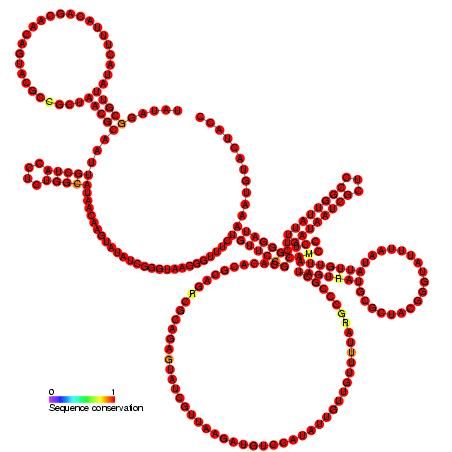
- Predicted secondary structure and sequence conservation of C0719

Identifiers
- Symbol: C0719
- Rfam: RF00117

Other data
- RNA type: Gene; sRNA
- Domain: Bacteria
- SO: SO:0000655
- PDB structures: PDBe

The C0719 RNA is a bacterial non-coding RNA of 222 nucleotides in length. It is found between the yghK and glcB genes, specifically in the genomes of Escherichia coli and Shigella flexneri. This non-coding RNA was originally identified in E. coli using high-density oligonucleotide probe arrays (microarray.) As of June 2026, the function of this ncRNA is unknown.

== See also ==
- C0299 RNA
- C0343 RNA
- C0465 RNA
