= IS128 RNA =

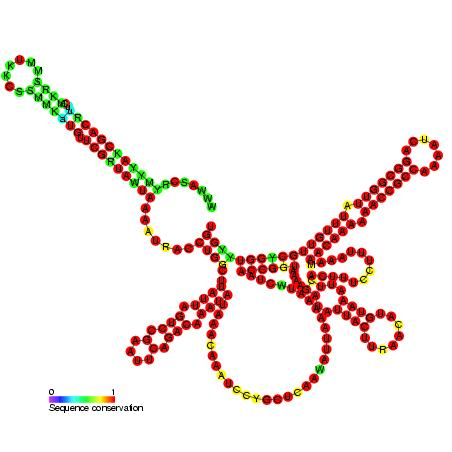
- Predicted secondary structure and sequence conservation of IS128

Identifiers
- Symbol: IS128
- Rfam: RF00125

Other data
- RNA type: Gene; sRNA
- Domain(s): Bacteria
- SO: SO:0001263
- PDB structures: PDBe

The IS128 RNA is a non-coding RNA found in bacteria such as Escherichia coli and Shigella flexneri. The RNA is 209 nucleotides in length. It is found between the sseA and sseB genes. The IS128 RNA was initially identified in a computational screen of the E. coli genome. The function of this RNA is unknown.

== See also ==
- IS061 RNA
- IS102 RNA
