= IS102 RNA =

Non-coding RNA

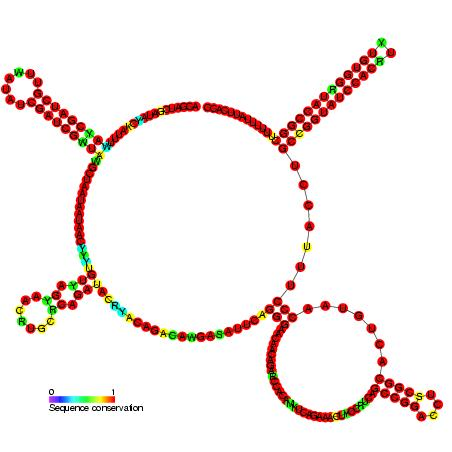
- Predicted secondary structure and sequence conservation of IS102

Identifiers
- Symbol: IS102
- Rfam: RF00124

Other data
- RNA type: Gene; sRNA
- Domain(s): Bacteria
- SO: SO:0000655
- PDB structures: PDBe

The IS102 RNA is a non-coding RNA that is found in bacteria such as Shigella flexneri and Escherichia coli. The RNA is 208 nucleotides in length and found between the yeeP and flu genes. This RNA was identified in a computational screen of E. coli. The function of this RNA is unknown.

== See also ==
- IS061 RNA
- IS128 RNA
