= SroB RNA =

Non-coding RNA gene

sroB RNA
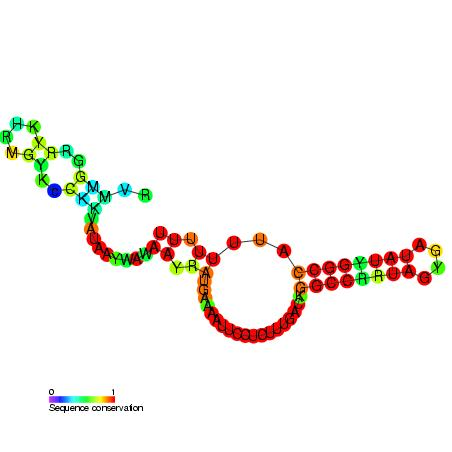
- Predicted secondary structure and sequence conservation of sroB

Identifiers
- Symbol: sroB
- Rfam: RF00368

Other data
- RNA type: Gene; sRNA
- Domain: Bacteria
- SO: SO:0000655
- PDB structures: PDBe

The sroB RNA (also known as MicM, rybC, or ChiX) is a non-coding RNA gene of 90 nucleotides in length. sroB is found in several Enterobacterial species, but its function is unknown. SroB is found in the intergenic region on the opposite strand to the ybaK and ybaP genes. SroB is expressed in stationary phase. Experiments have shown that SroB is a Hfq binding sRNA.

Further evidence has shown that SroB negatively regulates the outer membrane protein YbfM by sequestering the ribosome binding site of ybfM mRNA by an antisense interaction. SroB also regulates the DpiA/DpiB two-component system. Furthermore, SroB itself appears to be the target of a non-coding transcript from the chbBC intergenic region.
