= GLM =

GLM may refer to:

== Science and technology ==
- Generalized linear model, a generalization of ordinary linear regression
- General linear model, a generalization of multiple linear regression, special case of above
- Generalized Lagrangian mean, a method in continuum mechanics
- Geostationary Lightning Mapper, a satellite instrument
- General Language Model, a series of large language models by Z.ai

== Transport ==
- Gillingham railway station (Kent) (National Rail station code: GLM), England
- Gilman station (Amtrak station code: GLM), Illinois, US

== Other uses ==
- Global Language Monitor, a US company
- Grand Officer of the Legion of Merit (post-nominal letters: GLM), a class of the Legion of Merit, Rhodesia

== See also ==
- GlmY RNA
- GlmZ RNA
