= C0299 RNA =

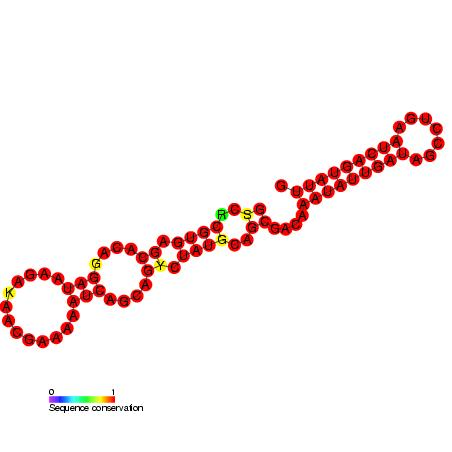
- Predicted secondary structure and sequence conservation of C0299

Identifiers
- Symbol: C0299
- Rfam: RF00119

Other data
- RNA type: Gene; sRNA
- Domain(s): Bacteria
- SO: SO:0001263
- PDB structures: PDBe

The C0299 RNA family consists of a group of Shigella flexneri and Escherichia coli RNA genes which are 78 bases in length and are found between the hlyE and umuD genes. The function of this RNA is unknown.

== See also ==
- C0343 RNA
- C0465 RNA
- C0719 RNA
