= IS061 RNA =

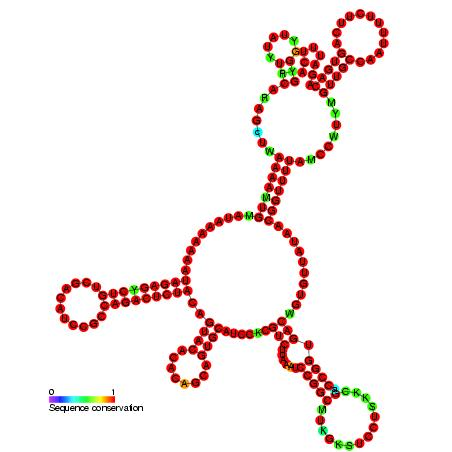
- Predicted secondary structure and sequence conservation of IS061

Identifiers
- Symbol: IS061
- Rfam: RF00115

Other data
- RNA type: Gene; sRNA
- Domain: Bacteria
- SO: SO:0001263
- PDB structures: PDBe

The ISO61 (IsrA) RNA is a bacterial non-coding RNA that is found between the abgR and ydaL genes in Escherichia coli and Shigella flexneri. It was discovered using a computational screen of the E. coli genome. Subsequent characterisation of ISO61 region has revealed that the reverse strand is actually a CsrA binding ncRNA called McaS and that it has a role in biofilm formation control. Furthermore, it has been shown that McaS(IsrA) exists as ribonucleoprotein particles (sRNPs), which involve a defined set of proteins including Hfq, S1, CsrA, ProQ and PNPase.

== See also ==
- IS102 RNA
- IS128 RNA
