= IscR stability element =

iscR stability element
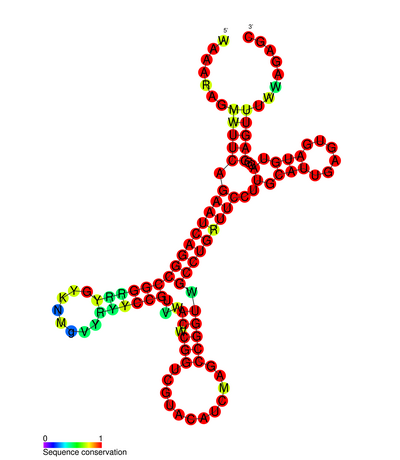
- Secondary structure of iscR stability element RNA

Identifiers
- Symbol: iscRS
- Rfam: RF01517

Other data
- RNA type: Cis-regulatory element
- Domain: Enterobacteriales
- PDB structures: PDBe

The IscR stability element is a conserved secondary structure found in the intergenic regions of iscRSUA polycistronic mRNA. This secondary structure prevents the degradation of the iscR mRNA.

The iscRSUA operon encodes for the proteins required in iron–sulfur cluster biosynthesis where the expression of this operon is regulated by RyhB and iscR, a transcription repressor. Under sufficient iron conditions RyhB binds to iscRSUA mRNA and promotes the degradation of the mRNA located downstream of iscR. Scanning the intergenic regions of this polycistronic mRNA and using Mfold software a secondary structure was predicted within the intergenic region between iscR and iscS and later confirmed by lead acetate probing. Mutations that disrupt this secondary structure resulted in the degradation of iscR mRNA after RyhB binding. 3′ RACE analysis of the iscR mRNA fragment identified the intergenic RNA at the 3′ end. These results suggest that this intergenic RNA element acts as an iscR mRNA stability element by protecting iscR from exonuclease degradation.
