= SAOUHSCs221 =

SAOUHSCs221 antisense RNA
- Predicted secondary structure and sequence conservation of SAOUHSCs221

Identifiers
- Symbol: SAOUHSCs221
- Alt. Symbols: art200, STnc490
- Rfam: XXXX

Other data
- RNA type: Gene; sRNA
- Domain: Bacteria
- PDB structures: PDBe

SAOUHSCs221 is a 108nt bacterial antisense RNA found by RNA-seq analysis in Staphylococcus aureus strain HG003 grown in rich medium, strain JKD60008 and strain NCTC8325.

SAOUHSCs221 is expressed antisense to the IS200 transposase sequence, at the level of the 5’UTR sequence of the transposase ORF. Construction of this family only identified homologues in Firmicutes. However a small RNA named art200 (antisense regulator of transposase IS200) was also described E. coli and S. enterica (enterobacteria).
