= MicL sRNA =

- Predicted secondary structure and sequence conservation of MicL small RNA

Identifiers
- Rfam: RF02654

Other data
- Domain(s): Bacteria
- GO: GO:0030371
- SO: SO:0000370
- PDB structures: PDBe

MicL RNA (mRNA-interfering complementary RNA regulator of Lpp) is a σ ^{E} transcription factor-dependent small non-coding RNA. It was discovered in E. coli. Together with MicA and RybB sRNAs, MicL sRNA down-regulates the synthesis of abundant outer membrane proteins in response to stress. MicL specifically targets mRNA of lipoprotein Lpp, preventing its translation.
