= GlmZ RNA =

Small non-coding RNA (ncRNA)

GlmZ RNA activator of glmS mRNA
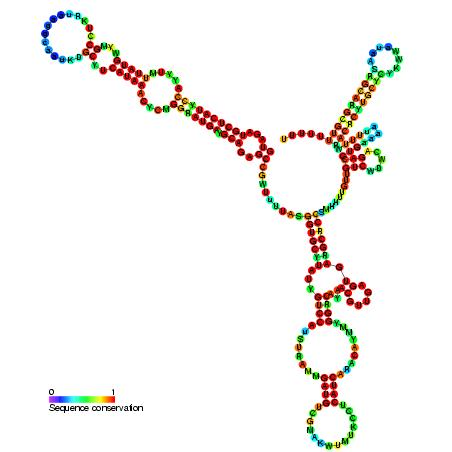
- Predicted secondary structure and sequence conservation of GlmZ_SraJ

Identifiers
- Symbol: GlmZ_SraJ
- Alt. Symbols: SraJ
- Rfam: RF00083

Other data
- RNA type: Gene; sRNA
- Domain: Bacteria
- SO: SO:0000655
- PDB structures: PDBe

GlmZ (formally known as SraJ) is a small non-coding RNA (ncRNA). It is the functional product of a gene which is not translated into protein.

This ncRNA was discovered in the bacteria Escherichia coli during a large scale computational screen for transcription signals and genomic features of known small RNA-encoding genes. During this screen 14 novel ncRNA genes were identified, including SraB, SraC, SraD and SraG.

The expression of SraJ was experimentally confirmed by Northern blotting. This ncRNA is expressed in early logarithmic phase, but its level decreases into stationary phase. Northern blot analysis also indicated this RNA undergoes specific cleavage processing.

The GlmZ sRNA has been shown to positively control the synthesis of GlmS mRNA. GlmZ is regulated by a related sRNA called GlmY. GlmY functions as an anti-adaptor, it binds to RapZ (RNase adaptor protein for sRNA GlmZ), this binding prevents RapZ from binding to GlmZ and targeting it for cleavage by RNase E.
