= SroD RNA =

Non-coding RNA

sroD RNA
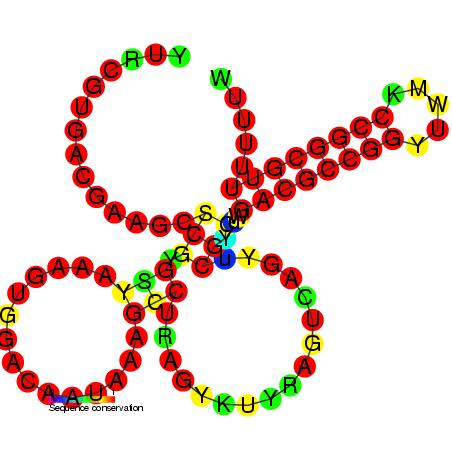
- Predicted secondary structure and sequence conservation of sroD

Identifiers
- Symbol: sroD
- Rfam: RF00370

Other data
- RNA type: Gene; sRNA
- Domain(s): Bacteria
- SO: SO:0000655
- PDB structures: PDBe

The bacterial sroD RNA gene is a non-coding RNA of 90 nucleotides in length. sroD is found in several Enterobacterial species but its function is unknown.

SroE and SroH were identified in the same bioinformatics search.
