= Acido-1 RNA motif =

Conserved RNA structure

Acido-1 RNA
- Consensus secondary structure of Acido-1 RNAs. This figure is adapted from a previous publication.

Identifiers
- Symbol: Acido-1
- Rfam: RF01686

Other data
- RNA type: Gene; sRNA;
- Domain: Bacteria;
- SO: SO:0000655
- PDB structures: PDBe

The Acido-1 RNA motif is a conserved RNA structure identified by bioinformatics. It is found only in acidobacteriota, and appears to be a non-coding RNA as it does not have a consistent association with protein-coding genes.
