= Anti small RNA =

RNA sequences

Anti GcvB sRNA
- Predicted secondary structure and sequence conservation Anti GcvB sRNA

Identifiers
- Rfam: RF02702

Other data
- Domain(s): Bacteria
- GO: GO:0045975
- SO: SO:0000370
- PDB structures: PDBe

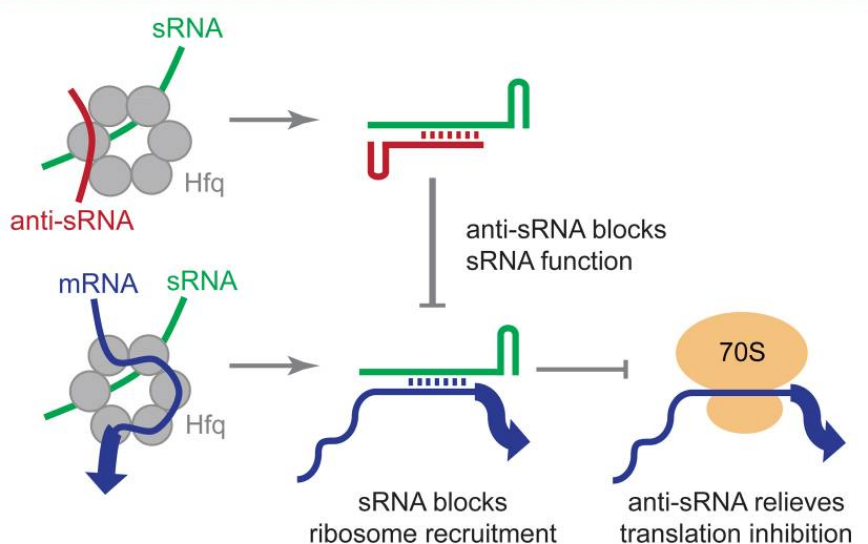
Proposed mechanism for anti-sRNA relief of sRNA mediated translation inhibition.

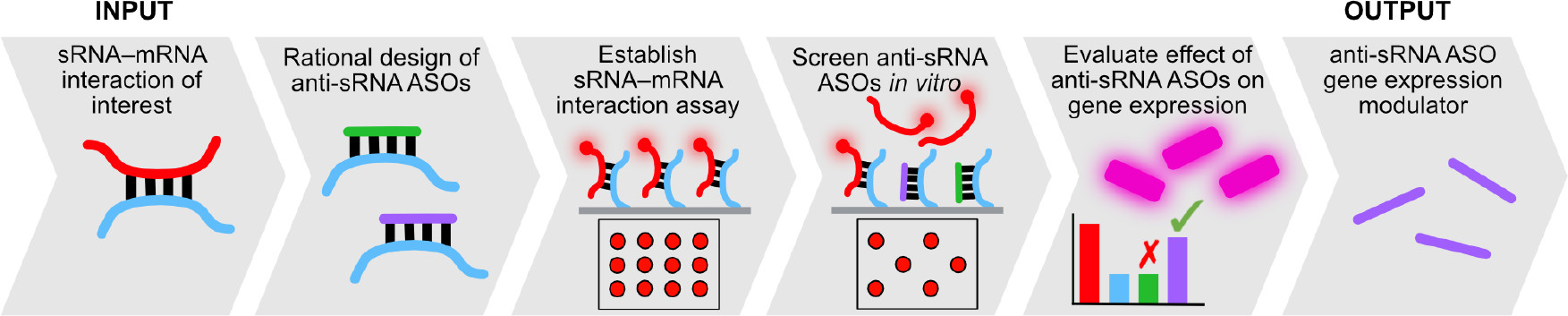
Antisense small RNA identification using RNA Array

Anti stx2 sRNA
- Predicted secondary structure and sequence conservation Anti stx2 sRNA

Identifiers
- Rfam: RF02703

Other data
- Domain(s): Bacteria
- GO: GO:0045975
- SO: SO:0000370
- PDB structures: PDBe

Antisense small RNAs (abbreviated anti small RNA or anti-sRNA) are short RNA sequences (about 50-500 nucleotides long) that are complementary to other small RNA (sRNA) in the cell.

sRNAs can repress translation via complementary base-pairing with their target mRNA sequence. Anti-sRNAs function by complementary pairing with sRNAs before the mRNA can be bound, thus freeing the mRNA and relieving translation inhibition. Anti-sRNAs lead to higher expression of mRNAs by inhibiting the action of sRNAs. Sponge RNA is another term used to describe anti-sRNAs.

== Discovery and identification methods ==
While the mRNA-regulating small RNAs were discovered in 1984, the first natural anti-sRNA was only discovered in 2014 in an Escherichia coli model. The initial characterization of antisense small RNA within E. coli models were demonstrated through microarrays and computational predictions. Recent experiments have used Northern blot analysis and 5'-end mapping to correctly identify potential antisense sRNA candidates. RNA-Seq has emerged as a popular method for the identification of small RNA, since its ability to distinguish between messenger and structural RNA allows for increased sensitivity in sRNA analysis. Strand-specific RNA-Seq provides further characterization of sRNA by predicting transcript structures with enhanced accuracy. In 2019, a new algorithm called APERO was established which allows accurate genome-wide detection of small transcripts from paired-end bacterial RNA-Seq data. Paired-end bacterial sequencing allows for sequencing across both ends of the fragment, which increases the accuracy of the read by providing enhanced alignment.

Protein-binding oriented techniques such as cross-linking immunoprecipitation, which isolates anti-sRNAs bound to proteins, have further contributed to the identification and detection of new anti-sRNA. A major contributor to this approach is the Hfq protein, a conserved RNA-binding protein that is known to attach various sRNAs. However, cross-linking immunoprecipitation fails to provide information on which two RNAs are interacting with each other, which is critical to identify the regulatory role of sRNAs. This shortcoming has been remedied by utilizing an RNA ligase to join the ends of the two RNAs that are interacting, allowing the mapping of sRNAs that are interacting with each other using RNA-Seq.

== Function ==
Antisense small RNA are found in all domains of life, including Eukaryotes, Bacteria and Archaea. They are non-coding RNA sequences involved in regulatory processes, such as metabolism and aiding in transcription. Many anti-sRNAs are involved in regulatory activities to modulate gene expression, with the bulk of research exploring specific interactions within the bacterial domain. One example of this is established in bacterial trans-encoded sRNA, which demonstrate only partial complementarity to the target RNA. These sRNA function to modulate base-pair interactions and translation by directly targeting the mRNA, thereby affecting its stability. Anti-sRNAs are able to interact with other sRNAs by targeting either the region involved in targeting the mRNA, or it can bind to another corresponding region along the sRNA. This has further been characterized in gene circuits that are sRNA-controlled and regulate aspects of bacterial pathogenesis.

Antisense small RNA can also be engineered and utilized by scientists to perform experimental functions. In synthetic biology, employing non-coding RNA such as antisense small RNA has advantages for creating regulatory architecture within engineering systems, provided the ability to predict function using the strand sequence. In experiments, engineered riboregulators, which are specific RNA that respond to signal RNA through complementary base pairing utilizing anti-small RNA, have been found to be capable of activating independent gene expression. Development of RNA array-based interaction assays that allow for screening in vitro have further advanced platforms targeting gene expression with antisense small RNAs. RNA-array based interaction assays screen for synthetic antisense small RNA interactions in vitro, through a surface-capture technique. An array of immobilized double-stranded DNA template for antisense small RNA sits opposite to an RNA-capture surface composed of possible antisense small RNA targets, separated by a solution of transcription reagents. Captured RNA are visualized using fluorescent staining, which can indicate whether a prospective antisense small RNA has been bound to its target.

Anti-bacterial targeting of V. cholerae occurs through the promotion of gene expression patterns that liberate bacteria from its host. This has been achieved by utilizing antisense small RNAs designed through the RNA array pipeline, opening the possibilities for future antimicrobial or therapeutic applications.

== Examples ==
=== AsxR ===
AsxR, previously known as EcOnc02, is an anti-sRNA encoded within the 3' region of the stx2B gene of E.Coli bacteria. It acts to increase expression of the ChuS heme oxygenase via destabilisation of FnrS sRNA. This aids bacterial infection of the animal host gut.

=== AgvB ===
AgvB, previously known as EcOnc01, inhibits GcvB sRNA repression. Pathogenicity island associated AgvB aids enterohemorrhagic E. coli growth at the colonized site within the host animal. This bacterial growth often manifests into an increased risk of developing other conditions such as hemolytic uremic syndrome.

=== RosA ===
RosA, has been found to inhibit two sRNAs (RoxS and FsrA). Inhibition of RoxS by RosA plays a role in metabolism regulation, while FsrA is involved in maintaining iron availability for protein function. RosA is also the first antisense small RNA experimentally confirmed in Gram-positive bacteria.
