= GlmY RNA =

Glm Y RNA activator of glmS mRNA
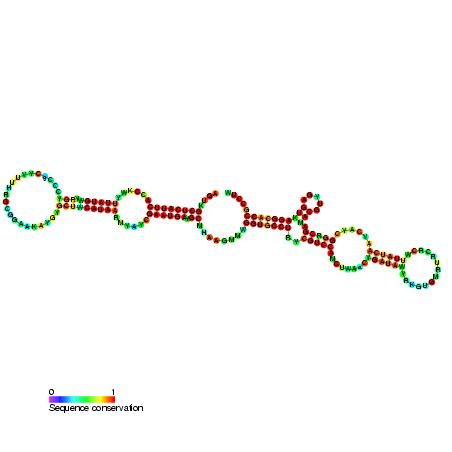
- Predicted secondary structure and sequence conservation of GlmY_tke1

Identifiers
- Symbol: GlmY_tke1
- Alt. Symbols: tke1
- Rfam: RF00128

Other data
- RNA type: Gene; sRNA
- Domain: Bacteria
- SO: SO:0000655
- PDB structures: PDBe

The GlmY RNA (formally known as tke1) family consists of a number of bacterial RNA genes of around 167 bases in length. The GlmY RNA gene is present in Escherichia coli, Shigella flexneri, Yersinia pestis and Salmonella species, where it is found between the yfhK and purL genes. It was originally predicted in a bioinformatic screen for novel ncRNAs in E. coli.

The GlmY sRNA has been shown to activate the synthesis of GlmS. It achieves this by influencing the action of another sRNA called GlmZ in a hierarchical fashion. GlmY functions as an anti-adaptor, it binds to RapZ (RNase adaptor protein for sRNA GlmZ), this binding prevents RapZ from binding to GlmZ and targeting it for cleavage by RNase E.

Further studies have shown that GlmY mutants are sensitive to cell envelope stress.
