= SraB RNA =

RNA Family

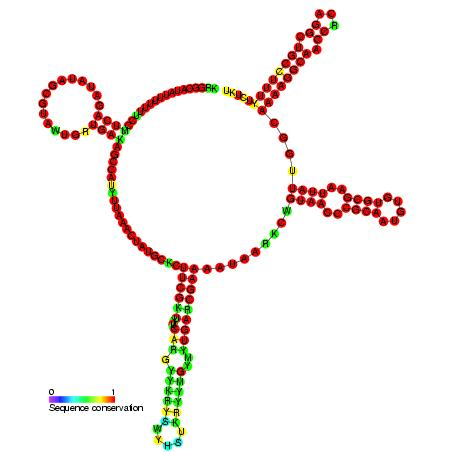
- Predicted secondary structure and sequence conservation of SraB

Identifiers
- Symbol: SraB
- Alt. Symbols: sraB
- Rfam: RF00077

Other data
- RNA type: Gene; sRNA
- Domain: Bacteria
- SO: SO:0000655
- PDB structures: PDBe

The SraB RNA is a small non-coding RNA discovered in E. coli during a large scale experimental screen. The 14 novel RNAs discovered were named 'sra' for small RNA, examples include SraC, SraD and SraG. This ncRNA was found to be expressed only in stationary phase. The exact function of this RNA is unknown but it has been shown to affect survival of Salmonella enterica to antibiotic administration in egg albumin. The authors suggest this may be due to SraB regulating a response to components in albumin.

== See also ==
- Escherichia coli sRNA
