= Tryptophan–tRNA ligase, mitochondrial =

Enzyme found in humans

WARS2

Identifiers
- Aliases: WARS2, TrpRS, tryptophanyl tRNA synthetase 2, mitochondrial, NEMMLAS, mtTrpRS, PKDYS3
- External IDs: OMIM: 604733; MGI: 1917810; GeneCards: WARS2
Enzyme activity
EC #	BRENDA	ExPASy	KEGG	MetaCyc
6.1.1.2	↗	↗	↗	↗

Gene location (Human)
Chr.	Chromosome 1 (human)
Band	1p12	Start	119,031,216 bp
Band	1p12	End	119,140,654 bp

Gene location (Mouse)
Chr.	Chromosome 3 (mouse)
Band	3|3 F2.2	Start	99,048,384 bp
Band	3|3 F2.2	End	99,146,502 bp
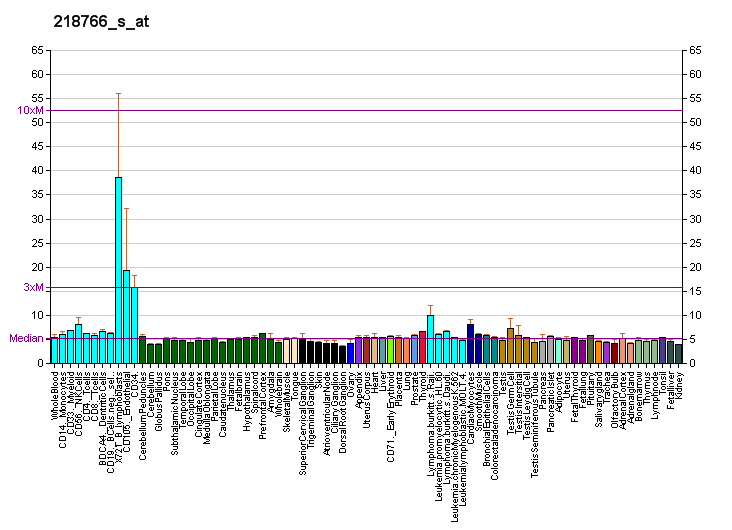
RNA expression pattern
Bgee	Human / Mouse (ortholog); Top expressed in: gonad; bronchial epithelial cell; Achilles tendon; testicle; parietal pleura; right adrenal cortex; tibia; left adrenal gland; body of pancreas; left adrenal cortex / Top expressed in: morula; submandibular gland; urethra; endocardial cushion; medullary collecting duct; gastrula; blastocyst; right kidney; lumbar subsegment of spinal cord; fossa; More reference expression data
BioGPS	More reference expression data
Gene ontology
Molecular function	aminoacyl-tRNA ligase activity; nucleotide binding; ligase activity; ATP binding; tryptophan-tRNA ligase activity
Cellular component	cytoplasm; mitochondrion; plasma membrane; mitochondrial matrix
Biological process	vasculogenesis; tryptophanyl-tRNA aminoacylation; tRNA aminoacylation for protein translation; protein biosynthesis; mitochondrial tryptophanyl-tRNA aminoacylation
Sources:Amigo / QuickGO
Orthologs
Databases	NCBI: entry; OMA: entry
Species	Human	Mouse
Entrez	10352	70560
Ensembl	ENSG00000116874	ENSMUSG00000004233
UniProt	Q9UGM6	Q9CYK1
RefSeq (mRNA)	NM_015836; NM_201263; NM_001378226; NM_001378227; NM_001378228 NM_001378229; NM_001378230; NM_001378231	NM_027462
RefSeq (protein)	NP_056651; NP_957715; NP_001365155; NP_001365156; NP_001365157 NP_001365158; NP_001365159; NP_001365160	NP_081738
Location (UCSC)	Chr 1: 119.03 – 119.14 Mb	Chr 3: 99.05 – 99.15 Mb
PubMed search
- Wikidata
View/Edit Human	View/Edit Mouse

Tryptophan–tRNA ligase, mitochondrial, also called Tryptophanyl-tRNA synthetase 2, is an enzyme that in humans is encoded by the WARS2 gene. Like the related enzyme, tryptophan–tRNA ligase, cytoplasmic, this enzyme functions as a tryptophan–tRNA ligase.

== Function ==
Aminoacyl-tRNA synthetases catalyze the aminoacylation of tRNA by their cognate amino acid. Because of their central role in linking amino acids with nucleotide triplets contained in tRNAs, aminoacyl-tRNA synthetases are thought to be among the first proteins that appeared in evolution. Two forms of tryptophanyl-tRNA synthetase exist, a cytoplasmic form, named WARS, and a mitochondrial form, named WARS2. This gene encodes the mitochondrial tryptophanyl-tRNA synthetase. Two alternative transcripts encoding different isoforms have been described.

== Medical significance ==
According to recent research, mutations in WARS2 are believed to express two different neurological disorders: A subtype of autosomal recessive intellectual disability and a syndrome of severe infantile‐onset leukoencephalopathy. These disorders have been called Parkinsonism-dystonia 3, childhood-onset (PKDYS3) and Neurodevelopmental disorder, mitochondrial, with abnormal movements and lactic acidosis, with or without seizures (NEMMLAS).
