= Streptococcus sRNA =

In molecular biology, Streptococcus sRNAs are small RNAs produced by species of Streptococcus bacteria. Several screens (both computational and experimental) have identified numerous sRNAs in different species and strains of Streptococcus including S. pneumoniae, S. pyogenes, S. agalactiae and S.mutans. The function of most of these is currently unknown, however a few have been characterised including FasX small RNA. Many sRNAs have roles in pathogenesis.

== See also ==
- Bacterial small RNA
