= RybB RNA =

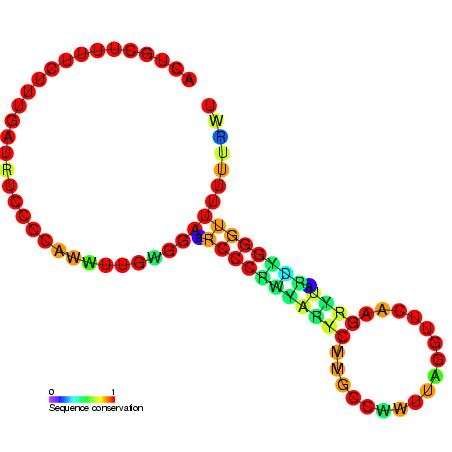
- Predicted secondary structure and sequence conservation of RybB

Identifiers
- Symbol: RybB
- Rfam: RF00110

Other data
- RNA type: Gene; sRNA
- Domain(s): Bacteria
- SO: SO:0000655
- PDB structures: PDBe

RybB is a small non-coding RNA was identified in a large scale screen of Escherichia coli. The function of this short RNA has been studied using a transcriptomic approach and kinetic analyses of target mRNA decay in vivo. RybB was identified as a factor that selectively accelerates the decay of multiple major omp mRNAs upon induction of the envelope stress response. This RNA has been shown to bind to the Hfq protein.

In Salmonella, direct interactions for RybB with the following targets have been verified experimentally: STM2391 (fadL), STM1070 (ompA), STM2267 (ompC), STM1572 (ompD), STM0999 (ompF), STM1473 (ompN), STM1995 (ompS), STM1732 (ompW), STM0413 (tsx), STM0687 (ybfM, chiP) and STM1530.

In Escherichia coli, direct interactions for RybB with the following targets have been verified experimentally: b0805 (fiu), b0721 (sdhC), b2215 (ompC), b1256 (ompW), b2594 (rluD) and b0081 (mraZ).

== See also ==
- RyfA RNA
- RydB RNA
- RydC RNA
- MicA RNA
