= SroE RNA =

Nucleotide with unknown function

sroE RNA
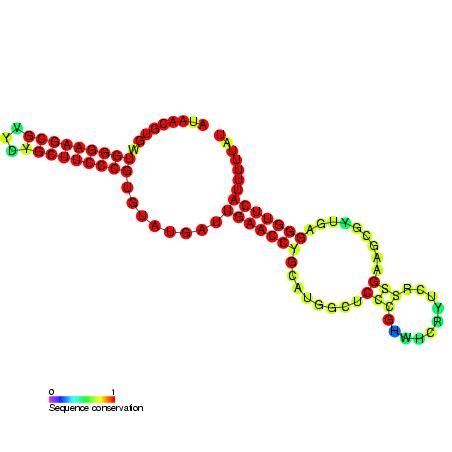
- Predicted secondary structure and sequence conservation of sroE

Identifiers
- Symbol: sroE
- Rfam: RF00371

Other data
- RNA type: Gene; sRNA
- Domain(s): Bacteria
- SO: SO:0000655
- PDB structures: PDBe

The bacterial sroE RNA gene is a non-coding RNA molecule of 90 nucleotides in length. sroE is found in several Enterobacterial species but its function is unknown.

SroD and SroH were identified in the same bioinformatics search.
