= SroH RNA =

sroH RNA
- Predicted secondary structure and sequence conservation of sroH

Identifiers
- Symbol: sroH
- Rfam: RF00372

Other data
- RNA type: Gene; sRNA
- Domain(s): Bacteria
- SO: SO:0000655
- PDB structures: PDBe

The bacterial sroH RNA is a non-coding RNA that is 160 nucleotides in length. The function of this family is unknown. An SroH gene deletion strain was shown to be sensitive to cell wall stress.

SroE and SroD were identified in the same bioinformatics search.
