= C0343 RNA =

Bacterial non-coding RNA

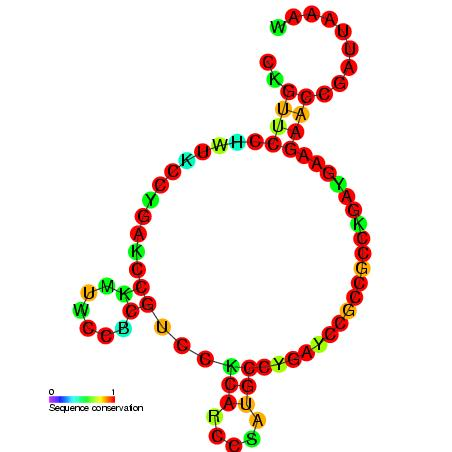

Identifiers
- Symbol: C0343
- Rfam: RF00120

Other data
- RNA type: Gene; sRNA;
- PDB structures: PDBe

The C0343 RNA is a bacterial non-coding RNA of 74 nucleotides in length that is found between the ydaN and dbpA genes in the genomes of Escherichia coli and Shigella flexneri, Salmonella enterica and Salmonella typhimurium. This ncRNA was originally identified in E. coli using high-density oligonucleotide probe arrays (microarray). The function of this ncRNA is unknown.

FnrS RNA was later found to be transcribed from the same intergenic region as C0343 RNA.

== See also ==
- C0299 RNA
- C0465 RNA
- C0719 RNA
