= Human endogenous retrovirus-W =

Human endogenous retrovirus W

Virus classification
- (unranked): Virus
- Realm: Riboviria
- Kingdom: Pararnavirae
- Phylum: Artverviricota
- Class: Revtraviricetes
- Order: Ortervirales
- Family: Retroviridae
- Genus: Gammaretrovirus (?)
- (unranked): Human endogenous retrovirus W

Viral elements in human DNA

Human Endogenous Retrovirus-W (HERV-W) is a family of Human Endogenous Retroviruses (HERVs).

HERVs are part of a superfamily of repetitive and transposable elements. Transposable elements are sequences of DNA that can move or "jump" around the genome, sometimes replicating and inserting themselves in different locations.

There are 31 known families of HERVs, constituting approximately about 8% of the human genome of which HERV-W DNA encoding sequences specifically account for about 1% of the human genome. For comparison, this represents about the same amount of DNA allocated to protein coding genes.

Most HERVs in the genome today are not able to replicate, because of genetic changes such as frame shifts, premature stop codons, and recombination in their long terminal repeats (LTRs). Each HERV family is derived from a single infection of the human germline by an external retrovirus. After integrating into the human DNA, these retroviruses expanded and evolved over time. A complete HERV includes a group of specific genes – gag, pro, pol and env – flanked on both sides by the long terminal repeats.

== Phylogeny ==
It is common for viruses to incorporate pieces of their host's genome into their own, which can aid in their success. On the other hand, hosts can also keep viral DNA in their genome, which may persist if advantageous or non-deleterious. In the case of HERVs, viral DNA is endogenized into the germ-line genome of a human ancestor. Thus, all the progeny of the infected human ancestor had this viral genome integrated into every cell in their bodies.

This new retroviral DNA can now be passed on from parent to child. Furthermore, the integrated viral genome has transposable element features, meaning it can replicate or jump in the human ancestor genome. Looking to the genomes of many species related to humans helped determine how long ago this retroviral genome was integrated into the human ancestor.

Performing southern blots with primate blood samples, and gag, pol, and pro probes, suggested that HERV-W entered the genome of catarrhine monkeys over 23 million years ago. Later, blood samples of hominoids, Old World monkeys, New World monkeys, and prosimians were probed using a fluorescently labeled HERV-W element derived from the gorilla fosmid library. Fluorescence in situ hybridization (FISH) revealed HERV-W elements in all the primate blood samples except that of the tupaia.

With this information and LTR dating values of the 5’ and 3’ LTRs, the construction of a phylogenetic tree was possible. This data implies that the HERV-W genome integrated into its host's germ-line around 63 million years ago, expanded in the era of Old and New World monkeys, and then evolved independently. Since its integration, the 5’ and 3’ LTRs have followed independent evolution in each species.

HERV-W is named for the fact that many in the group use a tryptophan tRNA at the primer binding site (PBS). The classification has been expanded into a HERVW9 group (HERV9, HERVW, HERV30, MER41, HERV35, LTR19) under the gammaretrovirus-like class I after a more robust phylogenetic study. A proposed nomenclature suggests putting all such "class I" elements in a genus-level taxon separate from Gammaretrovirus.

== Discovery ==
HERV-W was discovered because of its connection to multiple sclerosis (MS). In macrophage cell cultures of patients with MS, several retroviral-like particles with reverse transcriptase (RT) activity were detected and given the name multiple sclerosis retroviruses (MSRVs). Because of MSRV's retroviral nature, it was originally thought that MSRV had an exogenous viral origin.

However, MSRV's phylogenetic and experimental similarities to human endogenous retroviruses (HERVs) quickly revealed themselves. Thus, many labs began searching for the specific HERV family to which MSRV belonged. Using the consensus sequence for retroviral pol and "panretro" RT-PCR extensions from the pol region of MSRV (retroviral RNA), the discovery of a HERV with gag, pol, and env was made possible.

The primer binding site (PBS) of this HERV was discovered to be similar to avian retroviral PBSs, which use tRNATRP. This HERV was thus named HERV-W. In hopes of finding the open reading frames (ORFs) of this HERV, healthy tissues were probed with reverse transcribed Ppol-, gag-, and env-MSRV sequences (cDNAs). Overlapping cDNAs spanned a 7.6 kb complete HERV with RU5- gag- pol- env- U3R sequences, a polypurine tract, and a primer binding site (PBS).

The pol and gag ORFs are not replication-competent due to frame shifts and stop codons, but the env ORF is complete. Performing multiple-tissue Northern Blots on a variety of human tissues led to the discovery of 8-, 3.1- and 1.3-kb transcripts in placental tissue not expressed in heart, brain, lung, liver, skeletal muscle, kidney, or pancreas cells. This was confirmed by Ppol-MSRV, gag, and env probes.

Performing a BLASTn query search with the expressed sequence tags (ESTs) database for the cDNA clones derived from the probes, revealed that 53% of related transcripts were found in placental cells. A Southern Blot using hybridization of gag, pro, env derived probes revealed a complex distribution of HERV-Ws in the human haploid genome with 70 gag, 100 pro, and 30 env regions.

With in vitro transcription techniques three suggested ORFs on chromosome 3 (gag), 6 (pro), and 7 (env) were detected and further analyzed, revealing that the ORF on chromosome 7q21.2 uniquely encoded a glycosylated Env protein. Performing RealTime RT-PCR on adrenal gland, bone marrow, cerebellum, whole brain, fetal brain, fetal liver, heart, kidney, liver, lung, placenta, prostate, salivary gland, skeletal muscle, spinal cord, testis, thymus, thyroid gland, trachea, and uterus cells revealed 22 complete HERV-W families on chromosomes 1–3, 5–8, 10–12, 15, 19, and X.

In silico expression data revealed that these HERV-W elements are randomly expressed in various tissues (brain, mammary gland, cerebrum, skin, testis, eye, embryonic tissue, pancreatic islet, pineal gland, endocrine, retina, adipose tissue, placenta, and muscle).

Further, human tissues that lack some sort of HERV expression could not be found, which suggests that HERVs are permanent members of the human transcriptome. Although expression of HERV-W is prevalent in the whole body, there are two tissues whose expression levels are higher than the rest. The HERV-W-derived element of chromosome 12p11.21 and 7q21.2 had 42 hits from the env gene in pancreatic islet tissues, and 224 hits (11 gag, 41 pol, 164 env) in placenta, testis, and embryotic tissues, respectively. The HERV-W element on 7q21.2 encodes for ERVWE-1, which was named syncytin-1.

== Biological function ==
Upon realizing that HERV-W was prevalent in the human genome and can form viable transcripts, scientists began searching for HERV-W's biological significance. The HERV-W Env gene, expressed in a vector, was transfected into TELCeB6 and TELac2 cells, to test for virus-cell and cell-cell fusion, respectively. One-to-two days after transfection, numerous multinucleated giant cells, or syncytia, had formed, indicating the HERV-W env gene can cause homotypic and heterotypic cell-cell fusion.

As a control a gene known to be hyperfusogenic, A-Rless, was transfected into the cell-line. Upon transfection of cells with this vector, there was only a 6% fusion of cells, as opposed to a 48% fusion with the HERV-W vector, thus revealing the gene encoded by HERV-W env is a highly fusogenic membrane glycoprotein.

Retroviruses that infect human cells interact with different receptors, thus investigation began to find with which receptor HERV-W interacts. The HERV-W envelope glycoprotein could fuse parental TE671 cells (human embryo cells, identical to human rhabdomyosarcoma RD cells), and PiT-1- and PiT-2-blocked cells (PiT1/2 are retroviral (RV) receptors), but not retroviral type D receptor-blocked cells. It was concluded that HERV-W may recognize and interact with the type D mammalian retroviral receptors expressed in humans.

With the knowledge of HERV-W's highly fusogenic properties and its heightened expression in placental cells, a putative role for HERV-W in placental formation was suggested. The cytotrophoblast cells proliferate and invade maternal endometrium, which is key to implantation and placental development. Furthermore, cytotrophoblasts fuse and differentiate into multinucleated syncytiotrophoblast cells that are surrounded by maternal blood and cover the embryo. Syncytiotrophoblast help with nutrient circulation, ion exchange, and hormone synthesis, which are all key to development. These multinucleated cells appear very similar to virally induced syncytia.

HERV-W's main gene expression is ERVWE-1 which is a highly fusogenic env glycoprotein, which is also called syncytin-1 because it induces the formation of syncytia (multinucleated cells). Scientists began searching for ways that syncytin was involved in placental cytotrophoblast fusion and differentiation. Using monoclonal, fluorescently-labeled antibodies, the Frendo Lab was able to visualize the Env-W expression at the apical membrane of the syncytiotrophoblast in first-trimester placentas.

They were then able to show that syncytin affected both the fusion of the trophoblast to the uterus and the differentiation of the trophoblast. To do this they stained cells with anti-desmoplakin antibodies to reveal cell boundaries. As the cells differentiate into syncytiotrophoblasts the ability to see desmoplakin decreases, meaning that cells are fusing together.

Furthermore, as the cytotrophoblast differentiates the expression of HERV-W env mRNA and glycoprotein both increase collinearly, suggesting HERV-W env expression is correlated with the fusion and differentiation of cells. This data suggests the factor that regulates trophoblast differentiation also regulates HERV-W env mRNA and protein expression, and that a retroviral infection long ago may have been a pivotal event in mammalian evolution.

Furthermore, HERV-W env glycoprotein has been shown to contain an immunosuppressive region. This immunosuppressive nature of syncytin-1 and syncytin-2 (HERV-FRD) may be key in creating an immunologic barrier between the mother and the fetus. Since the fetus only share half of the mother's DNA, it is critical that the mother's immune system does not attack the fetus.

Analyzing 40 full-term placental tissues with immunohistochemical staining and RT in-situ PCR shows strong expression of syncytin-1 in syncytiotrophoblasts compared to cytotrophoblasts. This suggests a symbiotic relationship between HERV expression and the host.

In contrast to this data, placental micro-vesicles, which also have high expression of syncytin-1, have been shown through peripheral blood mononuclear cell assays to activate the immune system through the production of cytokines and chemokines. This suggests placental micro-vesicles can modulate the mother's immune system. One proposed route for this lies in exosomes, small membrane-bound vesicles that placental cells shed into the bloodstream. Syncytin-1 sits on the surface of these exosomes, and in laboratory tests a fragment of the protein corresponding to its immunosuppressive region reduced the output of the inflammatory signals TNF-alpha, interferon-gamma, and the chemokine CXCL10 from immune-challenged blood cells, offering a way for the protein to dampen the mother's immune response from beyond the placenta itself.

== Mechanism of expression and environmental factors ==
The mechanism of expression for HERV-W genes is still not completely understood. The 780 bp LTR's that flank the env, pro, pol, and gag genes provide a range of regulatory sequences such as promoters, enhancers, and transcription-factor binding sites. The 5’ U3 region acts as a promoter and the 3’ R acts as a poly A signal. It would be reasonable to assume that HERV-W genes could not be transcribed from HERV-W elements that have incomplete LTRs.

However, using a luciferase reporter gene assay, HERV-Ws that have incomplete LTR's were still found to have promoter activity. This suggests that the transcription of HERVs can be activated not just by LTR-directed transcription but also by transcriptional leakage, meaning if a nearby gene is being transcribed, the transcription factors and polymerase can keep moving along the DNA and reach the nearby HERV, where they can then transcribe it. In fact, by doing a Chip-seq analysis of HERV-W LTR's, it was found that 1/4 of HERV-W LTRs can be bound by transcription factor p56 (ENCODE Project). This indicates a reason behind HERV-W's cell-specific expression.

Different cell types transcribe various genes. If, for example, a highly transcribed gene for placental cells happens to be adjacent to a HERV-W element, transcriptional leakage could explain HERV-W's heightened expression in this case. This mechanism of transcription is still being studied.

Since there is a correlation between high cytokine production and MS, a study was done to test the regulation of a syncytin-1 promoter by MS-related cytokines such as TNFa, IFN-γ, and IL-6. This experiment was performed with human astrocytic cells and showed that TNFa has the ability to activate the ERVWE-1 promoter through an NF-κB element. Putative final mechanisms of control of ERVWE-1 are thought to be by CpG-promoter methylation and histone modification. Overexpression of ERVWE-1, which produces snyctin-1, would be dangerous in many adult cells. Thus, the promoter is methylated and histone modification occurs in non-placental cells to keep the expression of HERV-W low. In placenta cells, ERVWE-1 must be de-methylated to become active.

It is also thought that environmental factors can influence the expression of HERV-W. Through qPCR methods and infection of cells with influenza and human herpes simplex 1, it was found that HERV-W has a heightened expression in a cell-specific manner when infected; but no mechanism was revealed. Also, when these cells are placed in stressful environments, such as serum deprivation, similar and increased expression of HERV-W is also recorded.

This suggests that HERV-W is modulated by environmental effects. Another study of cells infected with influenza showed that this virus can transactivate HERV-W elements. Influenza produces glial cells missing 1 (GCM1) that can act as enhancers to reduce the repression of histone modification of HERV-Ws. This can lead to an increase in the transcription of HERV-W elements.

== HERV-W’s role in multiple sclerosis ==
Since the detection of MSRV Env protein in the plasma of multiple sclerosis patients and the realization that the protein is a member of the HERV-W family, the questions of how HERV-W was related to Multiple sclerosis and what caused transcription of HERV-W were investigated. Both the expression of MSRV in vitro with peripheral blood mononuclear cell (PBMC; such cells being critical to the immune system) cultures and in vivo in severe combined immunodeficiency (SCID) mouse models, illustrated a pro-inflammatory response.

Inflammation can occur when the immune system recognizes an antigen and activates the immune response cascade. The transcribed and translated products of the HERV-W Env gene come from retroviral DNA. Thus, the human body detects these proteins as antigens and triggers the immune response. Specifically, cytokine production is elevated in the MS PBMC cultures as compared to the healthy controls and as mediated by the surface unit of the MSRV-Env protein.

This suggests that the MSRV-Env protein may induce abnormal cytokine secretion, which leads to inflammation. A further explanation of how the expression of MSRV causes inflammation is found when looking at overexpression of syncytin-1 in glia cells (cells that surround the neurons). The result is endoplasmic reticulum stress that leads to neuro-inflammation and the production of free radicals, which leads to further damage of nearby cells.

Finally, it was discovered—through TLR-4 signaling assays, cytokine ELISAs, OPC cell cultures, and statistical analysis—that MSRV-Env is a highly potent TLR-4 activator. MSRV-Env in vitro and in vivo induces TLR4 dependent pro-inflammatory stimulus and weakens the precursor cells of oligodendrocytes, which produce myelin thorougout the central nervous system (CNS).

This suggests a positive feedback loop where cytokines promote HERV-W transcription and then the transcription of HERV-W leads to a higher cytokine production. Comparing Gag and Env expression in control patients with patients with MS, it was found that gag and env are expressed at physiological levels in cells of the CNS under normal conditions. However, in patients with MS lesions there is a large accumulation of Gag proteins in demyelinated white matter.

This data suggests that HERV-W env and gag genes in MS patients either have a distinct regulation of their inherited HERV-W copies or that HERV-W is infectious in MS patients. By examining the regulation of a syncytin-1 promoter, researchers were able to better understand the mechanism for ERVWE-1 regulation in nerve tissue. They found through a CHIP assay that the cytokine TNFa causes the p65 transcription factor to bind to the promoter. This was confirmed by deleting the cellular enhancer, where p65 binds, which resulted in less transcription.

A contrasting study performed a micro-array to analyze HERV transcription in human brains. Using 215 brain samples derived from schizophrenia (SZ), bipolar disorder (BD), and control patients, it was found that the expression of HERV – E/F/K was weakly correlated with SZ and BD and that ERVWE-1 expression remained unaffected in SZ and BD compared to controls.

It is still not known today if MSRV plays a causal or reactive role in MS. Another step in understanding the genomic origin of the HERV-W member transcribed in MS patients was made when looking into the HERV-W element of the Xq22.3. Since women are twice as likely to have MS, compared to men, and the Xq22.3 has almost a complete ORF thus a possible connection between Xq22.3 and MS was proposed.

== HERV-W and schizophrenia ==
To date, not much hard evidence has been found to support a strong correlation between HERV-W transcripts and schizophrenia (SZ). One study found that 10 out of 35 individuals with recent onset schizophrenia had retroviral pol gene HERV-W transcripts and murine leukemia virus gene transcripts in cell-free cerebrospinal fluid (CSF), compared to 1 in 20 patients with chronic schizophrenia.

This was significant when compared to the 22 non-inflammatory patients and the 30 healthy patients who had no retroviral transcripts. Contrasting this data, a micro-array was performed to analyze HERV transcription activity in human brains. They found a weak correlation between HERV's –K, -E, -F; and that env-W expression was constant in patients with schizophrenia and bipolar disorder (BD) compared to controls. Today, it is still hard to tell if HERVs play a causal role, are correlated with, or are just a response to, neuropsychiatric diseases.

== Drug Production ==
As knowledge about the mechanism of production for HERV-W transcripts is growing, scientists are beginning to synthesize drugs that can interrupt the MSRV pathway. A humanized monoclonal antibody called GNbAc1, of the IgG4 class, binds with high specificity and affinity to the extracellular domain of the MSRV-Env protein.

When performing experiments, another humanized IgG4 class antibody was used as a control. It was found through many experiments that GNbAc1 is able to antagonize all the MSRV-Env effects. This drug is still in its early stages of development.

On Jan 2019, the drug GNbAC1 was granted the name Temelimab by the World Health Organization (WHO)
