= Aar small RNA =

Small RNA

In molecular biology, the Aar small RNA is a small RNA (sRNA) produced by species of Acinetobacter. It was first discovered in Acinetobacter baylyi, and is located between the trpS and sucD genes. TrpS encodes tryptophanyl-tRNA-synthetase II and sucD encodes succinyl-coA-synthetase subunit alpha. Aar upregulates several mRNAs encoding proteins involved in amino acid metabolism.

In Acinetobacter baumannii, Aar represses expression of the outer membrane protein CarO and the siderophore receptor BfnH : https://academic.oup.com/nar/advance-article/doi/10.1093/nar/gkae668/7734169?login=true

== See also ==
- Bacterial small RNA
