= RydB RNA =

rydB RNA
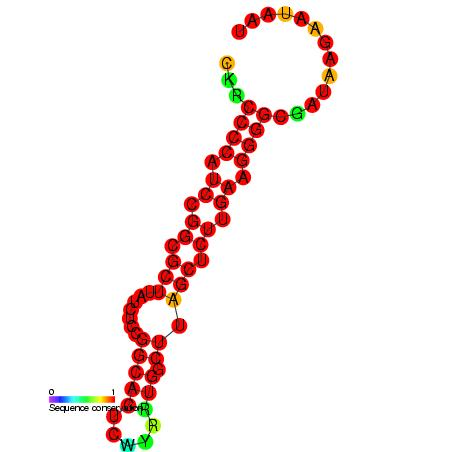
- Predicted secondary structure and sequence conservation of rydB

Identifiers
- Symbol: rydB
- Rfam: RF00118

Other data
- RNA type: Gene; sRNA
- Domain(s): Bacteria
- SO: SO:0000655
- PDB structures: PDBe

The RydB RNA is a non-coding RNA originally identified in E. coli in an RNA screen. This gene is only 67 nucleotides in length and is composed of a hairpin like structure. RydB lies between the ydiC and ydiH in E. coli. Homologous RNA genes have been found in other species such as Shigella flexneri and Salmonella species. The molecular function of this RNA is unknown.

== See also ==
- RyhB RNA
- RyeB RNA
- RyeE RNA
