= MicC RNA =

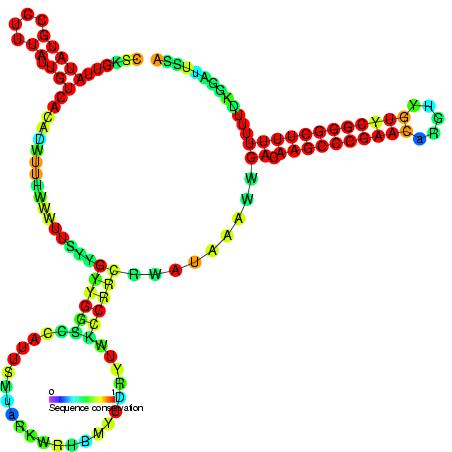
- Predicted secondary structure and sequence conservation of MicC

Identifiers
- Symbol: MicC
- Alt. Symbols: IS063
- Rfam: RF00121

Other data
- RNA type: Gene; sRNA
- Domain: Bacteria
- SO: SO:0000655
- PDB structures: PDBe

The MicC non-coding RNA (previously known as IS063) is located between the ompN and ydbK genes in E. coli. This Hfq-associated RNA is thought to be a regulator of the expression level of the OmpC porin protein, with a 5′ region of 22 nucleotides potentially forming an antisense interaction with the ompC mRNA. Along with MicF RNA this family may act in conjunction with EnvZ-OmpR two-component system to control the OmpF/OmpC protein ratio in response to a variety of environmental stimuli. The expression of micC was shown to be increased in the presence of beta-lactam antibiotics.

== See also ==
- Two-component regulatory system
