= Rma A small RNA =

RmaA sRNA
- Predicted secondary structure and sequence conservation of RmaA small RNA

Identifiers
- Rfam: RF02629

Other data
- Domain(s): Bacteria
- GO: GO:0005515,GO:2000145
- SO: SO:0000370
- PDB structures: PDBe

In molecular biology, the regulator of motility and amylovoran A (RmaA) gene is a bacterial non-coding RNA. It was discovered in genome-wide identification of Hfq binding sRNAs in plant pathogen Erwinia amylovora. Together with Hfq it positively controls motility and negatively controls the production of acidic exopolysaccharide amylovoran in E. amylovora.
