= RyeE RNA =

CyaR/Rye RNA
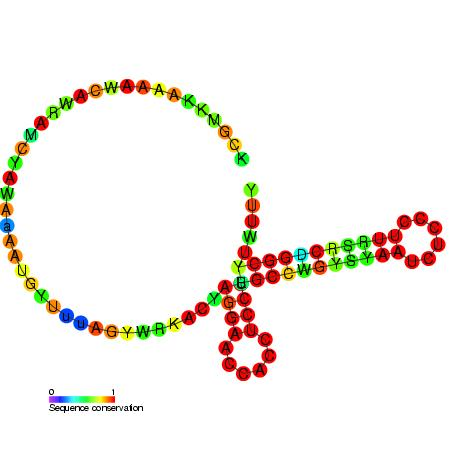
- Predicted secondary structure and sequence conservation of CyaR_RyeE

Identifiers
- Symbol: CyaR_RyeE
- Alt. Symbols: RyeE
- Rfam: RF00112

Other data
- RNA type: Gene; sRNA
- Domain(s): Bacteria
- SO: SO:0000655
- PDB structures: PDBe

The CyaR RNA (formerly known as RyeE RNA) non-coding RNA was identified in a large scale screen of Escherichia coli and was called candidate 14. The exact 5′ and 3′ ends of this RNA are uncertain. This gene lies between yegQ and orgK in E. coli. This small RNA was shown to be bound by the Hfq protein. This RNA has been renamed as CyaR for (cyclic AMP-activated RNA). It has been shown that the CyaR RNA acts as a repressor of the porin OmpX. It has also been shown that cyaR expression is tightly controlled by the cyclic AMP receptor protein, CRP.

A comparative genomics approach was able to detect and verify the additional targets ptsI, sdhA and yobF.

== See also ==
- RydB RNA
- RyhB RNA
- RyeB RNA
