= AfaR small RNA =

In molecular biology, AfaR small RNA is an Hfq-dependent small RNA produced by the bacterium Escherichia coli. It is an Hfq-dependent RNA which downregulates AfaD-VIII invasin translation by binding to and initiating cleavage of its mRNA.

The transcription of AfaR is dependent on the stress response sigma factor sigma E.

== See also ==
- Bacterial small RNA
