= SroC RNA =

sroC RNA
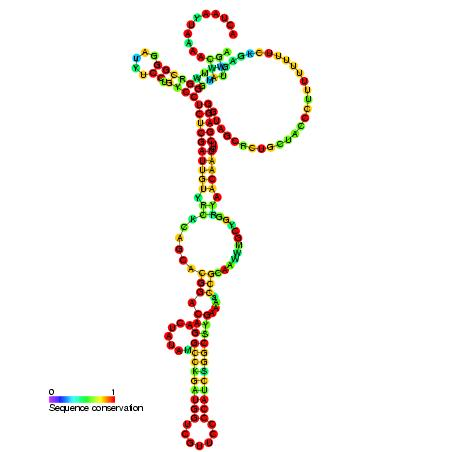
- Predicted secondary structure and sequence conservation of sroC

Identifiers
- Symbol: sroC
- Rfam: RF00369

Other data
- RNA type: Gene; sRNA
- Domain(s): Bacteria
- SO: SO:0000655
- PDB structures: PDBe

The bacterial SroC RNA is a non-coding RNA gene of around 160 nucleotides in length. SroC is found in several enterobacterial species. This RNA interacts with the Hfq protein.

SroC acts as a ‘sponge,’ and base pairs with and regulates activity of the sRNA GcvB. This interaction triggers the degradation of GcvB by RNase E, alleviating the GcvB-mediated mRNA repression of other amino acid-related transport and metabolic genes.
