= GadY =

Non-coding RNA gene

Gady
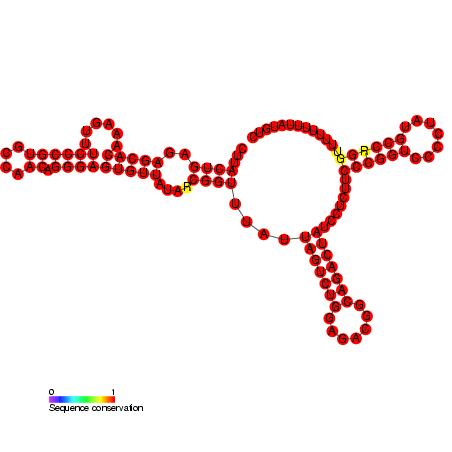
- Predicted secondary structure and sequence conservation of GadY

Identifiers
- Symbol: GadY
- Alt. Symbols: IS183
- Rfam: RF00122

Other data
- RNA type: Gene; sRNA
- Domain(s): Bacteria
- SO: SO:0001263
- PDB structures: PDBe

GadY RNA (previously named IS183 in) is a non-coding RNA. The GadY gene is located on between and on the opposite strand to the GadX and GadW genes. GadY can form base pairs with the 3' UTR of its target mRNA gadX, this pairing is thought to confer increased stability to the transcript, allowing accumulation of gadX (a transcriptional regulator of the acid response) and therefore increased expression of downstream acid resistance genes. The GadY gene produces three overlapping transcripts that differ in length. The long form is 105 nucleotides in length and two processed versions are 59 and 90 nucleotides in length. It has been shown that all three forms of GadY bind to the Hfq protein.
