= RyeB RNA =

Non-coding RNA

SdsR/RyeB RNA
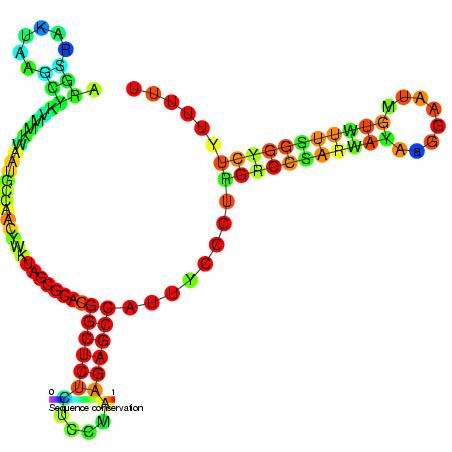
- Predicted secondary structure and sequence conservation of SdsR_RyeB

Identifiers
- Symbol: SdsR_RyeB
- Rfam: RF00111

Other data
- RNA type: Gene; sRNA
- Domain(s): Bacteria
- SO: SO:0000655
- PDB structures: PDBe

The SdsR/RyeB RNA is a non-coding RNA that was identified in a large scale screen of E. coli. The exact 5′ and 3′ ends of this RNA are uncertain. This RNA overlaps the SraC/RyeA RNA on the opposite strand suggesting that the two may act in a concerted manner. It is transcribed by general stress factor σ^{s} and is most highly expressed in stationary phase. SdsR/RyeB RNA interacts with Hfq.

The homologous sRNA in S. enterica was shown to regulate synthesis of major porin OmpD. A study using Salmonella identified 20 targets of this sRNA including transcriptional regulator, CRP, global DNA-binding factors, StpA and HupB, the antibiotic transporter protein, TolC, and the RtsA/B two-component system (TCS), and validated their post-transcriptional control by SdsR/RyeB RNA.

== See also ==
- RydB RNA
- RyhB RNA
- RyeE RNA
