= RnaG =

RnaG sRNA
- Predicted secondary structure and sequence conservation of RnaG small RNA

Identifiers
- Rfam: RF02550

Other data
- Domain(s): Bacteria
- SO: SO:0000077,SO:0000370
- PDB structures: PDBe

RnaG is a small regulatory non-coding RNA encoded by the virulence plasmid of Shigella flexneri, a Gram-negative pathogenic bacterium that causes human bacillary dysentery. It is a first regulatory RNA characterised in S. flexneri. The RNA is 450 nucleotides long (which makes it one of the largest regulatory sRNAs) and it contains a region with specific secondary structure that interacts with icsA (virG) mRNA and forms a transcription terminator. Acting as antisense, RnaG is transcribed from the complementary strand of its target, icsA mRNA. The activity of the incA protein is crucial for spreading of the bacterial pathogen in the host cells.
