= VR-RNA =

In molecular biology, VR-RNA is a small RNA produced by Clostridium perfringens. It functions as a regulator of the two-component VirR/VirS system.

VR-RNA regulates numerous genes including:

- Toxin-encoding genes plc, colA and cpb2
- Other virulence-related genes such as hyaluronidases and sialidase
- Possible collagen adhesin gene (cna)
- Extracellular nuclease, cadA
- Enzymes such as Acid phosphatase, Heme oxygenase HemO and N-acetylglucosaminidases
- Genes encoding transport proteins
- Genes involved in carbohydrate metabolism
- Genes encoding transport proteins
- Arginine deiminase (ADI) pathway genes
- Genes involved in citrate metabolism

VR-RNA regulates the toxin colA (collagenase) by base-pairing to colA mRNA, the 3′ end of VR-RNA base-pairs to a region in the 5′UTR of the colA mRNA. This induces cleavage of the colA mRNA in the 5′ UTR and leads to stabilisation of the mRNA and increased translation.

== See also ==
- Bacterial small RNA
