= Spot 42 RNA =

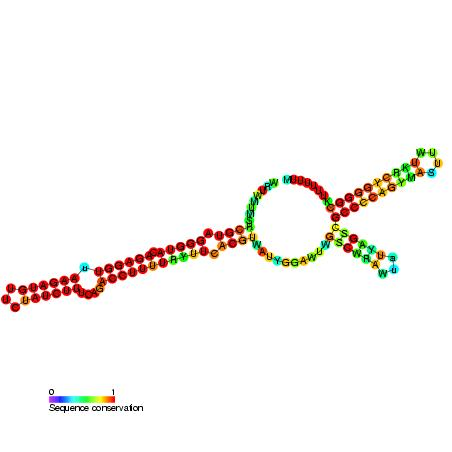
- Predicted secondary structure and sequence conservation of Spot_42

Identifiers
- Symbol: Spot_42
- Alt. Symbols: Spot42
- Rfam: RF00021

Other data
- RNA type: Gene; sRNA
- Domain: Bacteria
- SO: SO:0000389
- PDB structures: PDBe

Spot 42 (spf) RNA is a regulatory non-coding bacterial small RNA encoded by the spf (spot forty-two) gene. Spf is found in gammaproteobacteria and the majority of experimental work on Spot42 has been performed in Escherichia coli and recently in Aliivibrio salmonicida. In the cell Spot42 plays essential roles as a regulator in carbohydrate metabolism and uptake, and its expression is activated by glucose, and inhibited by the cAMP-CRP complex.

The sRNA is transcribed from a separate promoter and binds to messenger RNA targets through imperfect base pairing. The half-life of Spot42 in vivo is 12 to 13 minutes at 37 °C. When grown in media supplemented with glucose, each cell contains 100–200 Spot42 copies. The corresponding level is however reduced 3–4-fold when cells are grown in succinate or when cAMP is added to cells grown in glucose.

== Discovery ==
Spot42 was first described in 1973 as an unstable RNA species of 109 nucleotides in Escherichia coli. It was discovered by polyacrylamide gel electrophoresis and 2-D fingerprinting in an attempt to study the accumulation of small RNAs in E. coli during amino acid starvation. In these experiments the electrophoretic mobility of Spot42 was similar to that of 5S rRNA. In 1979 Spot42 was found to accumulate under growth in the presence of glucose (i.e., when adenosine 3′,5′-cyclic monophosphate (cAMP) is low). During growth with a non-glucose carbon source (i.e., when cAMP concentrations are high) the Spot42 concentrations were found to be significantly lower.

Later experiments showed that over-expression of Spot42 (~10 fold increase) resulted in impaired growth and lowered ability to adapt to shifts to richer media. Further, shift from glucose to succinate as the carbon source resulted in a long lag period and slow growth rate. It was also stated that the reason for the abnormal responses was caused by an elevated number of excessive Spot42 RNA gene products rather than excess of the gene itself. A deletion study of spf in E. coli cells resulted in viable spf null mutants, which indicates that Spot42 is non-essential, at least under controlled lab conditions.

== Genomic localization and natural distribution ==
The natural distribution of the spf gene is restricted to 5 orders of gammaproteobacteria; Enterobacteriales, Aeromonadales, Vibrionales, Alteromonadales, Chromatiales.

=== Enterobacteriaceae ===
The spf gene is highly conserved in Escherichia, Shigella, Klebsiella, Salmonella, Yersinia genera within the family Enterobacteriaceae. In E. coli the spf gene is flanked by polA (upstream) and yihA (downstream). A CRP binding sequence and -10 and -35 promoter sequences are found upstream of spf.

=== Vibrionaceae ===
Spf is also highly conserved within the family Vibrionaceae, and was recently identified in all 76 available Vibrionaceae genomes (e.g., Vibrio, Aliivibrio, Photobacterium and Grimontia genera). In e.g., Vibrio cholerae, Vibrio vulnificus, Aliivibrio fischeri and Aliivibrio salmonicida the spf gene is flanked by polA (upstream) and a sRNA gene encoding the novel VSsRNA24 (downstream).

== Biological function and specific targets ==
It was for some years unclear if the function of Spot 42 was mediated through the 109 nucleotide RNA itself or if the function was mediated through the 14 amino acids long peptide which is hypothetically encoded from within the sRNA sequence. This was based on the observation that Spot42 contains structural features similar to other non-coding RNAs found in E. coli (such as 6S RNA and lambda bacteriophage), as well as features that are typically found in mRNAs (i.e., polypurine sequence followed by AUG, 14 amino acids and an UGA terminator). Using a filter binding assay and other methods showed that Spot 42 is not an mRNA. In this approach the affinity between Spot42 and the 70S ribosome was tested. Here, Spot 42 showed very inefficient binding to purified 70S ribosomes, which lead to the conclusion that the function of Spot 42 is mediated by the RNA itself. Bækkedal and Haugen made a Spot42 consensus secondary structure based on all known "spf" sequences at the time (2015) and found that the spot42 gene is highly conserved across the 5 orders it is identified. The secondary structure has highly conserved nucleotide positions that have the potential to participate in binding with known mRNA targets.

=== Biological function of Spot42 in Escherichia coli ===
In E. coli Spot 42 accumulates under growth in the presence of glucose (i.e., when adenosine 3′,5′-cyclic monophosphate (cAMP) is low). The direct responsiveness of Spot 42 levels to glucose and cAMP is due to repression of spf expression by a cAMP-CRP (cAMP-receptor protein) complex. Spot42 is found in 100–200 copies per cell when cells are grown in glucose, and is reduced 3–4 folds when cells are grown in succinate (a secondary carbon sources). The reduction of Spot42 in cells grown in secondary carbon sources is a result of binding of the cAMP-CRP complex to the spf promoter, which negatively regulates transcription of Spot42. Later, the proximity of spf to polA (gene encoding DNA polymerase I) led Polayes and co-workers to test whether the products of these genes could influence each other. They found that by reducing levels of Spot 42, either by deletion of spf or by manipulating the growth conditions, the DNA pol A activity was reduced. The underlying mechanism for this observation remains however unknown.

==== Spot42 targets in Escherichia coli ====
Spot42 can interact directly with mRNA targets through base pairing. The first Spot 42 target was discovered by Møller et al. who showed that Spot 42 specifically binds to a short complementary region at the translation initiation region of galK (encodes a galactoinase). galK is the third gene in the galactose operon, which contains four genes (galETKM) and produces a polycistronic mRNA. Spot 42 mediates discoordinate expression of the gal operon (i.e., the individual genes in the operon are not similarly expressed) by binding to the galK Shine-Dalgarno region, thereby blocking ribosome binding and translation of the galK gene. The physiological significance of the coordinate expression is unclear, but suggests that Spot 42 plays a role in fine-tuning gene expression to optimize the utilization of carbon sources.

Beisel and Storz demonstrated with microarray analysis and reporter fusions that Spot 42 plays a broader role in metabolism by regulating at least 14 operons. These operons contain a number of genes involved in uptake and catabolism of non-favoured carbon sources. During overexpression of Spot 42 sixteen different genes show 2-fold elevated levels of mRNA. The identified genes are mostly involved in central and secondary metabolism, as well as uptake and catabolism of non-preferred carbon sources and oxidation of NADH.

A comparative genomics approach was able to broaden the link of Spot 42 with the Escherichia coli TCA cycle. Next to the previously reported, TCA affiliated target gltA both icd and sucC were computationally predicted and subsequently experimentally verified as direct targets of Spot 42. In addition this approach detected gdhA as direct target of Spot42. gdhA codes for the glutamate dehydrogenase and links citrate cycle and nitrogen metabolism.

=== Biological function and targets of Spot42 RNA in Salmonella ===
A study combining a transcriptome wide binding map of the Hfq protein with a comparative target prediction has aided in identifying the mglB (STM2190) mRNA as a direct target of Spot42.

=== Biological function and targets of Spot42 RNA in A. salmonicida ===
The observation that A. salmonicida contains the spf gene (which encodes Spot 42), but lacks the galK operon (the natural Spot 42 target in E. coli), have inspired scientists to study the role of Spot 42 in this fish pathogen. A. salmonicida is unable to utilize galactose (lacks gal operon) in minimal medium and addition of galactose has little effect on the growth rate. When cells are grown in glucose the level of Spot42 is increased 16–40 folds, but is in contrast decreased 3 folds when cAMP is added, indicating that Spot42 probably have similar roles as in E. coli (i.e., in carbohydrate metabolism). It has been hypothesized that Spot 42 works in concert with a novel sRNA gene, called VSsrna24, located 262 nt downstream of spf. The VSsrna42 RNA is approximately 60 nt in length and has an expression pattern opposite to that of Spot42. Furthermore, in a spf deletion mutant a gene encoding a pirin-like protein was upregulated 16 folds. Pirin has key roles in the central metabolism by regulating the activity of pyruvate dehydrogenase E1 and therefore select if pyruvate will be fermented or go through respiration through the TCA cycle and electron transport.
