= 5 prime ureB sRNA =

Small RNA

In molecular biology, 5' ureB sRNA is a small RNA. It is located at the 5' end of the ureB gene in the urease gene cluster and is antisense to ureB. Its expression is regulated by the arsS/arsR two-component regulatory system, arsS downregulates 5' ureB sRNA expression under acidic conditions leading to an increase in ureB expression. 5' ureB sRNA suppresses transcription of ureA and ureB by base-pairing with ureAB mRNA resulting in premature termination of the transcript to the 5' of ureB.

== See also ==
- Bacterial small RNA
