= RyfA RNA =

ryfA RNA
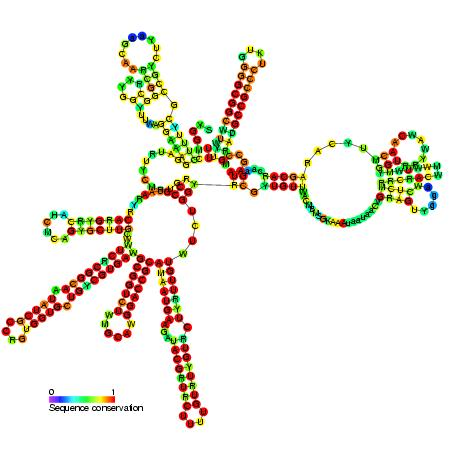
- Predicted secondary structure and sequence conservation of ryfA

Identifiers
- Symbol: ryfA
- Rfam: RF00126

Other data
- RNA type: Gene; sRNA
- Domain: Bacteria
- SO: SO:0000655
- PDB structures: PDBe

The ryfA RNA gene is a non-coding RNA present in E. coli, Shigella flexneri and Salmonella species where it is found between the ydaN and dbpA genes. These RNA genes are about 300 nucleotides in length. The function of this RNA is unknown.
