= OmrA-B RNA =

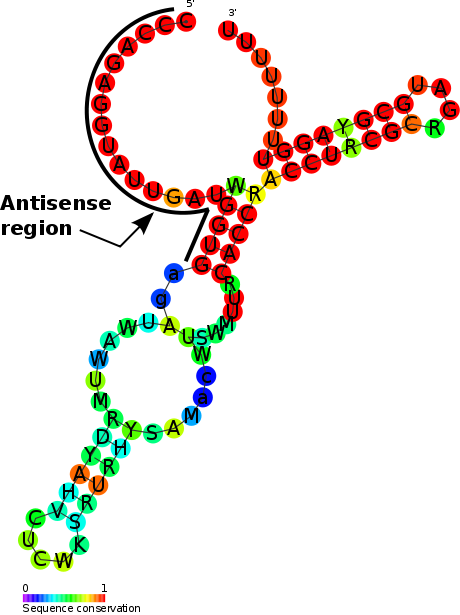
- A representation of the bacterial OmrA-B secondary structure including a colour scheme that indicates the degree of sequence conservation.

Identifiers
- Symbol: OmrA-B
- Alt. Symbols: OmrA, OmrB, SraE, RygA, RygB
- Rfam: RF00079

Other data
- RNA type: Gene
- Domain(s): Bacteria; Enterobacteriaceae
- PDB structures: PDBe

The OmrA-B RNA gene family (also known as SraE RNA, RygA and RygB and OmrA and OmrB) is a pair of homologous OmpR-regulated small non-coding RNA that was discovered in E. coli during two large-scale screens. OmrA-B is highly abundant in stationary phase, but low levels could be detected in exponentially growing cells as well. RygB is adjacent to RygA a closely related RNA. These RNAs bind to the Hfq protein and regulate gene expression by antisense binding. They negatively regulate the expression of several genes encoding outer membrane proteins, including cirA, CsgD, fecA, fepA and ompT by binding in the vicinity of the Shine-Dalgarno sequence, suggesting the control of these targets is dependent on Hfq protein and RNase E. Taken together, these data suggest that OmrA-B participates in the regulation of outer membrane composition, responding to environmental conditions.

Together with the RNA chaperone Hfq, OmrA-B positively controls bacterial motility and negatively controls the production of acidic exopolysaccharide amylovoran in plant pathogen Erwinia amylovora.
