= SgrS RNA =

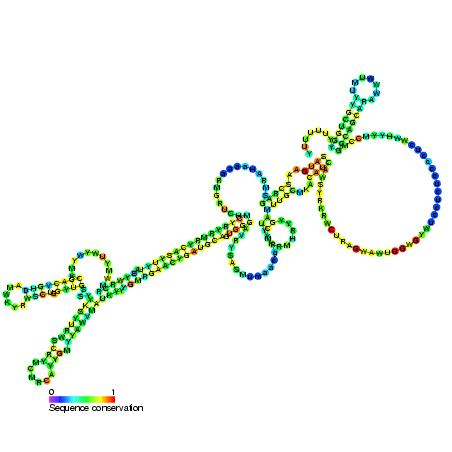
- Predicted secondary structure and sequence conservation of SgrS

Identifiers
- Symbol: SgrS
- Rfam: RF00534

Other data
- RNA type: Gene; antisense
- Domain(s): Bacteria
- GO: GO:0032057 GO:0043488 GO:0030371
- SO: SO:0000655
- PDB structures: PDBe

SgrS (sugar transport-related sRNA, previously named ryaA) is a 227 nucleotide small RNA that is activated by SgrR in Escherichia coli during glucose-phosphate stress. The nature of glucose-phosphate stress is not fully understood, but is correlated with intracellular accumulation of glucose-6-phosphate. SgrS helps cells recover from glucose-phosphate stress by base pairing with ptsG mRNA (encoding the glucose transporter) and causing its degradation in an RNase E dependent manner. Base pairing between SgrS and ptsG mRNA also requires Hfq, an RNA chaperone frequently required by small RNAs that affect their targets through base pairing. The inability of cells expressing sgrS to create new glucose transporters leads to less glucose uptake and reduced levels of glucose-6-phosphate. SgrS is an unusual small RNA in that it also encodes a 43 amino acid functional polypeptide, SgrT, which helps cells recover from glucose-phosphate stress by preventing glucose uptake. The activity of SgrT does not affect the levels of ptsG mRNA of PtsG protein. It has been proposed that SgrT exerts its effects through regulation of the glucose transporter, PtsG.

SgrS was originally discovered in E. coli but homologues have since been identified in other Gammaproteobacteria such as Salmonella enterica and members of the genus Citrobacter. A comparative genomics based target prediction approach that employs these homologs, has been developed and was used to predict the SgrS target, ptsI (b2416), which was subsequently verified experimentally.
