= YbaK protein domain =

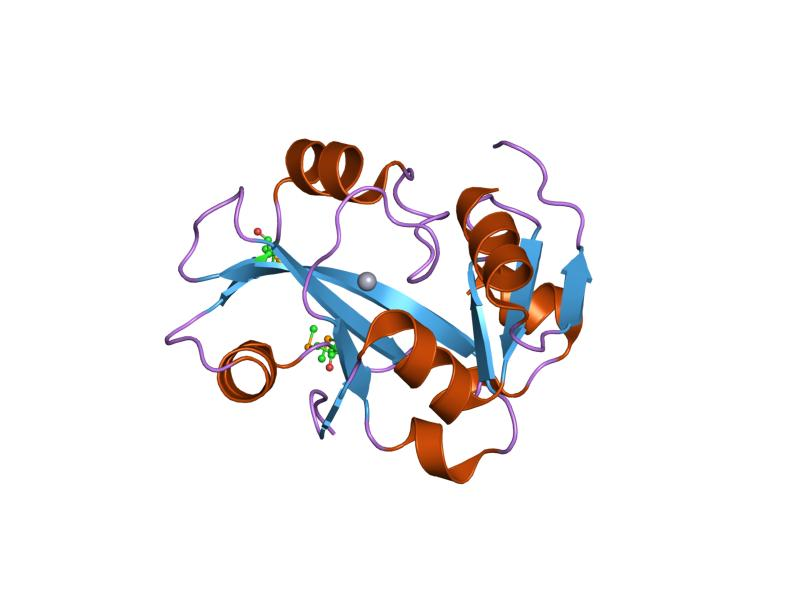
- Crystal structure of Cysteinyl-tRNA(Pro) deacylase protein from Haemophilus influenzae (hi1434)

Identifiers
- Symbol: YbaK
- Pfam: PF04073
- InterPro: IPR007214
- SCOP2: 1dbx / SCOPe / SUPFAM
- CDD: cd04332
Available protein structures:
- PDB: IPR007214 PF04073 (ECOD; PDBsum)
- AlphaFold: IPR007214; PF04073

In molecular biology, this protein domain of unknown function is found in numerous prokaryote organisms. This domain also occurs in a number of prolyl-tRNA synthetases (proRS) from prokaryotes. Thus, the domain is thought to be involved in oligonucleotide binding, with possible roles in recognition/discrimination or editing of prolyl-tRNA.

== Function ==
Studies have shown that YbaK functions as a Cys-tRNAPro deacylase in vivo, deacetylation additionally involves turning genes off, hence, it can be assumed that it is preventing the addition of an amino acid to a tRNA molecule, thus preventing translation. In vitro studies with the full set of 20 E. coli aminoacyl-tRNAs revealed that the Haemophilus influenzae and E. coli YbaK proteins are moderately general aminoacyl-tRNA deacylases that preferentially hydrolyze Cys-tRNAPro and Cys-tRNACy. Furthermore, YbaK-mediated hydrolysis of aminoacyl-tRNA has been indicated to influence cell growth. It has been further indicated that YbaK domain is important in the editing function if the wrong amino acid has been joined to the wrong tRNA.

== Structure ==
The structure of YbaK shows a novel fold. This domain also occurs in a number of prolyl-tRNA synthetases (proRS) from prokaryotes. Thus, the domain is thought to be involved in oligonucleotide binding, with possible roles in recognition/discrimination or editing of prolyl-tRNA. YbaK is a highly curved mixed seven-stranded beta-sheet surrounded by six short alpha helices
