= FasX small RNA =

In molecular biology, the FasX small RNA (fibronectin/fibrinogen-binding/haemolytic-activity/streptokinase-regulator-X) is a non-coding small RNA (sRNA) produced by all group A Streptococcus. FasX has also been found in species of group D and group G Streptococcus. FasX regulates expression of secreted virulence factor streptokinase (SKA), encoded by the ska gene. FasX base pairs to the 5' end of the ska mRNA, increasing the stability of the mRNA, resulting in elevated levels of streptokinase expression. FasX negatively regulates the expression of pili and fibronectin-binding proteins on the bacterial cell surface. It binds to the 5' untranslated region of genes in the FCT-region in a serotype-specific manner, reducing the stability of and inhibiting translation of the pilus biosynthesis operon mRNA by occluding the ribosome-binding site through a simple Watson-Crick base-pairing mechanism.

== See also ==
- Bacterial small RNA
