= DicF RNA =

Non-coding RNA

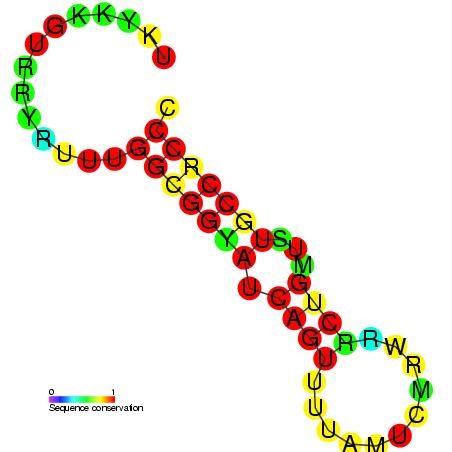
- Predicted secondary structure and sequence conservation of DicF

Identifiers
- Symbol: DicF
- Rfam: RF00039

Other data
- RNA type: Gene; antisense
- Domain: Bacteria
- GO: GO:0003729
- SO: SO:0000644
- PDB structures: PDBe

DicF RNA is a non-coding RNA that is an antisense inhibitor of cell division gene ftsZ. DicF is bound by the Hfq protein which enhances its interaction with its targets. Pathogenic E. coli strains possess multiple copies of sRNA DicF in their genomes, while non-pathogenic strains do not. DicF and Hfq are both necessary to reduce FtsZ protein levels, leading to cell filamentation under anaerobic conditions.
