= Tryptophan–tRNA ligase, cytoplasmic =

Enzyme found in humans

WARS1
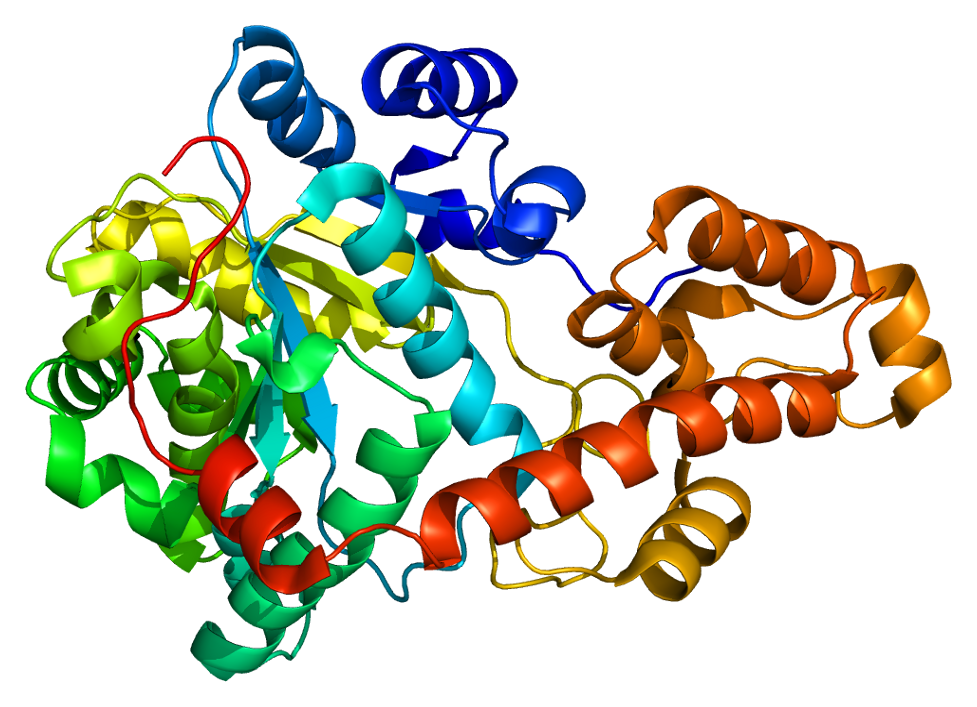

Identifiers
- Aliases: WARS1, Tryptophanyl-tRNA synthetase, cytoplasmic, GAMMA-2, IFI53, IFP53, tryptophanyl-tRNA synthetase, HMN9, tryptophanyl-tRNA synthetase 1, WARS
- External IDs: OMIM: 191050; MGI: 104630; GeneCards: WARS1
Available structures
PDB	Ortholog search: PDBe RCSB
PDB	List of PDB id codes 1O5T, 1R6T, 1R6U, 1ULH, 2AKE, 2AZX, 2DR2, 2QUH, 2QUI, 2QUJ, 2QUK
Enzyme activity
EC #	BRENDA	ExPASy	KEGG	MetaCyc
6.1.1.2	↗	↗	↗	↗

Gene location (Human)
Chr.	Chromosome 14 (human)
Band	14q32.2	Start	100,333,790 bp
Band	14q32.2	End	100,376,805 bp

Gene location (Mouse)
Chr.	Chromosome 12 (mouse)
Band	12|12 F1	Start	108,825,956 bp
Band	12|12 F1	End	108,860,100 bp
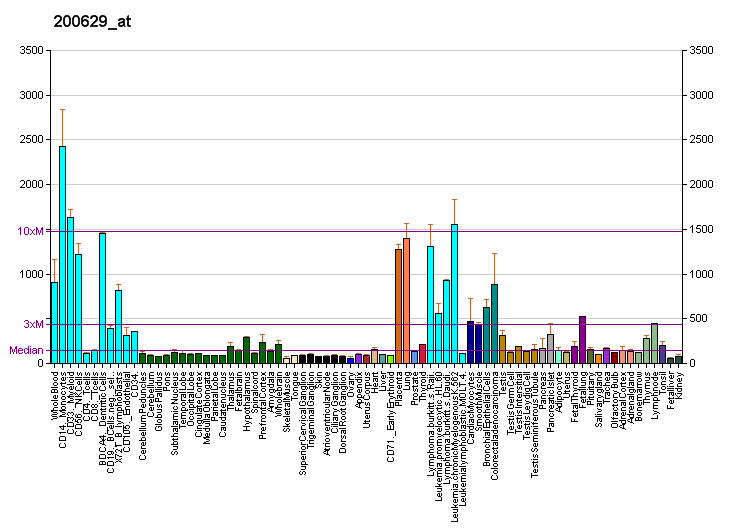

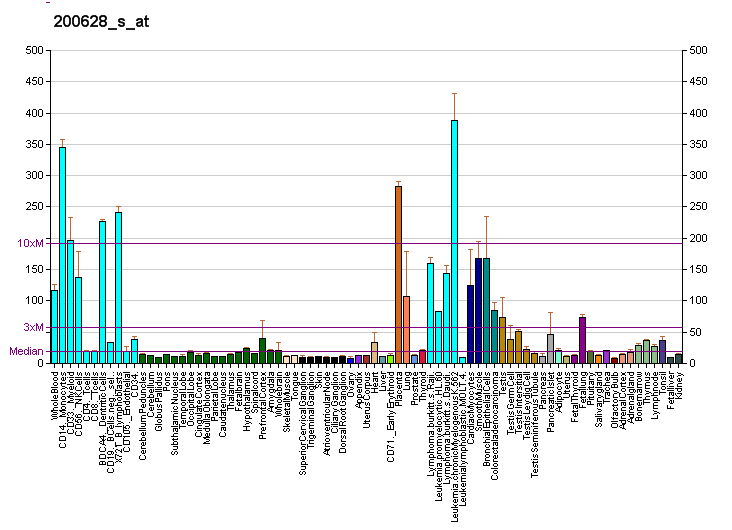
RNA expression pattern
Bgee	Human / Mouse (ortholog); Top expressed in: monocyte; granulocyte; upper lobe of left lung; right lung; apex of heart; appendix; islet of Langerhans; rectum; epithelium of colon; stromal cell of endometrium / Top expressed in: gastrula; crypt of lieberkuhn of small intestine; decidua; seminal vesicula; gastric mucosa; mucous cell of stomach; epithelium of stomach; pyloric antrum; medulla oblongata; pontine nuclei; More reference expression data
BioGPS	More reference expression data
Gene ontology
Molecular function	aminoacyl-tRNA ligase activity; nucleotide binding; ligase activity; protein binding; ATP binding; tryptophan-tRNA ligase activity; kinase inhibitor activity; protein kinase binding; protein domain specific binding; protein homodimerization activity
Cellular component	extracellular exosome; nucleus; cytoplasm; cytosol; protein-containing complex
Biological process	regulation of angiogenesis; protein biosynthesis; tRNA aminoacylation for protein translation; angiogenesis; negative regulation of cell population proliferation; tryptophanyl-tRNA aminoacylation; negative regulation of protein phosphorylation; negative regulation of protein kinase activity; positive regulation of gene expression; regulation of protein ADP-ribosylation; positive regulation of protein-containing complex assembly
Sources:Amigo / QuickGO
Orthologs
Databases	NCBI: entry; OMA: entry
Species	Human	Mouse
Entrez	7453	22375
Ensembl	ENSG00000140105	ENSMUSG00000021266
UniProt	P23381	P32921
RefSeq (mRNA)	NM_004184; NM_173701; NM_213645; NM_213646	NM_001164314; NM_001164488; NM_011710
RefSeq (protein)	NP_004175; NP_776049; NP_998810; NP_998811	NP_001157786; NP_001157960; NP_035840
Location (UCSC)	Chr 14: 100.33 – 100.38 Mb	Chr 12: 108.83 – 108.86 Mb
PubMed search
- Wikidata
View/Edit Human	View/Edit Mouse

Tryptophan–tRNA ligase, cytoplasmic, also called Tryptophanyl-tRNA synthetase 1, is an enzyme that in humans is encoded by the WARS1 gene (previously WARS). As a tryptophan–tRNA ligase, it attaches the amino acid tryptophan to its cognate tRNA.

Two forms of tryptophanyl-tRNA synthetase exist, a cytoplasmic form, named WARS1, and a mitochondrial form, named WARS2. WARS1 catalyzes the aminoacylation of tRNA^{Trp} with tryptophan and is induced by interferon. Tryptophanyl-tRNA synthetase belongs to the class I tRNA synthetase family. Four transcript variants encoding two different isoforms have been found for this gene.

== Phenylalanine incorporation ==
Although WARS1 classically aminoacylates tryptophan, but during states of tryptophan depletion, it has been observed activating both tryptophan and phenylalanine.

== Medical significance ==
Pathogenic (heterozygous) mutations in WARS1 are associated with dysfunction of the motor neurons leading to progressive muscle weakness and atrophy of the arms and legs, called autosomal dominant distal hereditary motor neuronopathy-9 (HMND9).
