= FnrS RNA =

FnrS
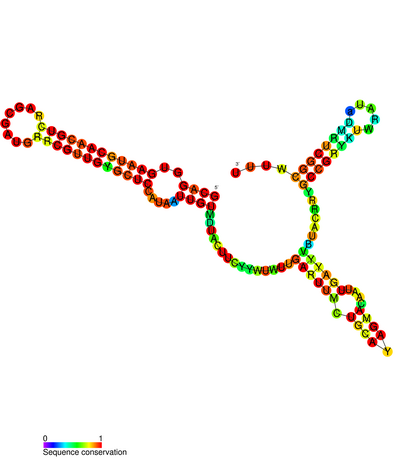
- Conserved secondary structure of FnrS RNA. The colour of nucleotides indicate their conservation within the family.

Identifiers
- Symbol: FnrS
- Rfam: RF01796

Other data
- RNA type: Gene
- Domain: Enterobacteriaceae
- PDB structures: PDBe

FnrS RNA is a family of Hfq-binding small RNA whose expression is upregulated in response to anaerobic conditions. It is named FnrS because its expression is strongly dependent on fumarate and nitrate reductase regulator (FNR), a direct oxygen availability sensor.

A conserved intergenic region between genes ydaN and dbpA was predicted to encode an sRNA, adjacent to where another non-coding RNA (C0343) has been identified. However, northern blot analysis of this 477bp sequence yielded no results. A subsequent tiling array analysis sequencing Hfq-binding sRNA found that the Watson strand did indeed encode an sRNA.

== Gene regulation ==
FnrS has been shown to downregulate 32 different mRNAs in Enterobacteria, in 15 of these cases it does so by base-pairing with the mRNA transcript. The majority of genes downregulated by FnrS are required for aerobic metabolism or the oxidative stress response. Some of the genes downregulated by FnrS are:

- adhP - an alcohol dehydrogenase involved in metabolism
- cydD - zinc sensitive ATP-binding component of cytochrome-related transport
- mqo - membrane associated malate:quinone oxidoreductase which operates in the citric acid cycle
- sodB/A - a superoxide dismutase which aids with oxygen stress resistance
- ygiW - a hypothetical outer membrane protein

A study incorporating comparative target prediction and subsequent experimental verification of selected predictions, suggests that FnrS might be a more global regulator in Escherichia coli. It is predicted to control several transcription factors. These include the verified targets marA and IscR. MarA activates genes involved in the resistance to superoxide, which might not be necessary at the anaerobic conditions where FnrS is expressed. IscR regulates genes for iron-sulfur-cluster containing or biogenesis proteins. FnrS might be involved in the observed O_{2} dependent expression of the IscR regulon. Further targets of FnrS are nagZ and sdhA.

There is also evidence to suggest that the expression of FnrS is regulated by the RcsCDB signalling system in Salmonella enterica.
