= GcvB RNA =

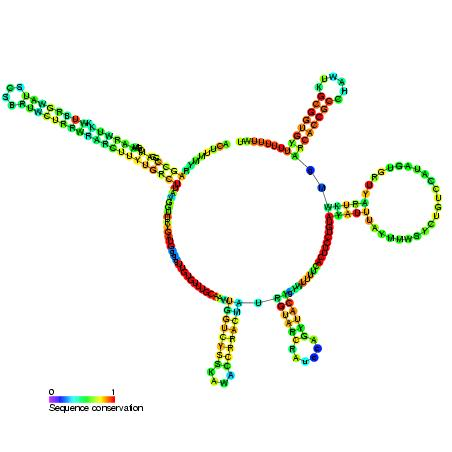
- Predicted secondary structure and sequence conservation of GcvB

Identifiers
- Symbol: GcvB
- Rfam: RF00022

Other data
- RNA type: Gene
- Domain: Bacteria
- SO: SO:0000379
- PDB structures: PDBe

The gcvB RNA gene encodes a small non-coding RNA involved in the regulation of a number of amino acid transport systems as well as amino acid biosynthetic genes. The GcvB gene is found in enteric bacteria such as Escherichia coli. GcvB regulates genes by acting as an antisense binding partner of the mRNAs for each regulated gene. This binding is dependent on binding to a protein called Hfq. Transcription of the GcvB RNA is activated by the adjacent GcvA gene and repressed by the GcvR gene. A deletion of GcvB RNA from Y. pestis changed colony shape as well as reducing growth. It has been shown by gene deletion that GcvB is a regulator of acid resistance in E. coli. GcvB enhances the ability of the bacterium to survive low pH by upregulating the levels of the alternate sigma factor RpoS. A polymeric form of GcvB has recently been identified. Interaction of GcvB with small RNA SroC triggers the degradation of GcvB by RNase E, lifting the GcvB-mediated mRNA repression of its target genes.

== Targets of GcvB ==
GcvB has been shown to regulate a large number of genes in E. coli and Salmonella species. GcvB was shown to bind to Oppa and DppA which transport oligopeptides and dipeptides respectively. It has been shown to also regulate gltL, argT, STM, livK, livJ, brnQ, sstT and cycA which are involved in uptake of a variety of amino acids. GcvB RNA also is involved in regulating a variety of genes involved in amino acid biosynthesis such as ilvC, gdhA, thrL and serA. GcvB RNA binds PhoPQ mRNA, which encodes a two-component system involved in magnesium homeostasis.

== Polymerisation ==
There is evidence that E. coli GcvB can form polymers. Native polyacrylamide gel electrophoresis was used to show a higher molecular weight band corresponding to a potential polymer. Transmission electron microscopy was then used to identify a filamentous structure for the polymer. However, the authors suggest that these long filaments are unlikely to be physiologically relevant. It was shown that a construct containing only the first 61 nucleotides including the first stem-loop was sufficient for polymerisation. Similar results were recently shown for the DsrA RNA. The physiological relevance of polymerisation is not known.

== Species distribution ==
The GcvB RNA is found in a range of bacteria including:

- Escherichia coli
- Yersinia pestis
- Haemophilus influenzae
- Vibrio cholerae
- Shigella dysenteriae
- Salmonella typhimurium
- Klebsiella pneumoniae
- Photorhabdus luminescens
- Pasteurella multocida
