= Tryptophan–tRNA ligase =

Class of enzymes

Identifiers
- EC no.: 6.1.1.2
- CAS no.: 9023-44-3

Databases
- BRENDA: enzyme data
- ExPASy: NiceZyme view
- KEGG: enzyme entry
- MetaCyc: metabolic pathway
- Rhea: reactions
- PDB structures: RCSB PDB PDBe PDBsum
- Gene Ontology: AmiGO / QuickGO
Search
- PMC: articles
- PubMed: articles
- NCBI: proteins

In enzymology, a tryptophan–tRNA ligase (EC 6.1.1.2) is an enzyme that catalyzes the chemical reaction

ATP + L-tryptophan + tRNA^{Trp} $\rightleftharpoons$ AMP + diphosphate + L-tryptophyl-tRNA^{Trp}

The 3 substrates of this enzyme are ATP, L-tryptophan, and tRNA^{Trp}, whereas its 3 products are AMP, diphosphate, and L-tryptophyl-tRNA^{Trp}.

In humans there are two separate isozymes: tryptophan–tRNA ligase, cytoplasmic (WARS1) and tryptophan–tRNA ligase, mitochondrial (WARS2). This enzyme belongs to the family of ligases, to be specific those forming carbon–oxygen bonds in aminoacyl-tRNA and related compounds. The systematic name of this enzyme class is L-tryptophan:tRNA^{Trp} ligase (AMP-forming). Other names in common use include tryptophanyl-tRNA synthetase, L-tryptophan-tRNA^{Trp} ligase (AMP-forming), tryptophanyl-transfer ribonucleate synthetase, tryptophanyl-transfer ribonucleic acid synthetase, tryptophanyl-transfer RNA synthetase, tryptophanyl ribonucleic synthetase, tryptophanyl-transfer ribonucleic synthetase, tryptophanyl-tRNA synthase, tryptophan translase, and TrpRS. This enzyme participates in tryptophan metabolism and aminoacyl-tRNA biosynthesis.

== Structural studies ==
As of late 2007, 21 structures have been solved for this class of enzymes, with PDB accession codes PDB: 1D2R, PDB: 1I6K, PDB: 1I6L, PDB: 1I6M, PDB: 1M83, PDB: 1MAU, PDB: 1MAW, PDB: 1MB2, PDB: 1O5T, PDB: 1R6T, PDB: 1R6U, PDB: 1ULH, PDB: 1YIA, PDB: 1YID, PDB: 2A4M, PDB: 2AKE, PDB: 2AZX, PDB: 2DR2, PDB: 2G36, PDB: 2IP1, and PDB: 2OV4.
