= RyhB =

90 nucleotide RNA

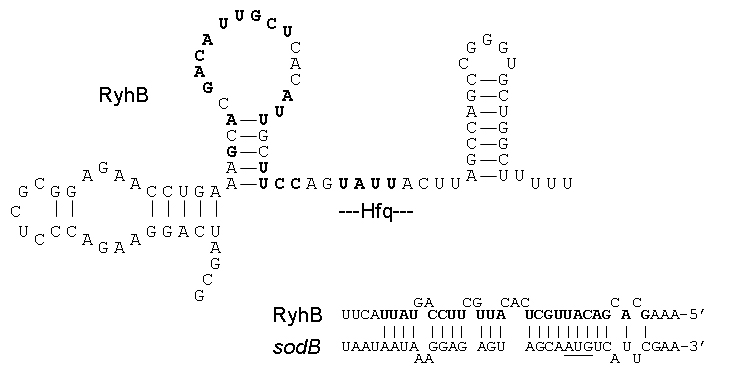
Secondary structure for the RyhB RNA. The Sm-like protein Hfq binds to the AU-rich unstructured region of RyhB as indicated. Below the secondary structure, the primary sequence of RyhB is shown along with its putative binding interaction to the target mRNA sodB. The start codon for sodB is underlined. RyhB nucleotides that participate in the interaction are in bold.

RyhB RNA is a 90 nucleotide RNA that down-regulates a set of iron-storage and iron-using proteins when iron is limiting; it is itself negatively regulated by the ferric uptake repressor protein, Fur (Ferric uptake regulator).

== Discovery ==
The gene was independently identified in two screens, named RyhB by Wassarman et al. and called SrI by Argaman et al. and was found to be expressed only in stationary phase.

== Function and regulation ==
RyhB RNA levels are inversely correlated with mRNA levels for the sdhCDAB operon, encoding succinate dehydrogenase, as well as five other genes previously shown to be positively regulated by Fur by an unknown mechanism. These include two other genes encoding enzymes in the tricarboxylic acid cycle, acnA and fumA, two ferritin genes, ftnA and bfr, and a gene for superoxide dismutase, sodB. A number of other genes have been predicted computationally and verified as targets by microarray analysis: napF, sodA, cysE, yciS, acpS, nagZ and dadA. RyhB is bound by the Hfq protein, that increases its interaction with its target messages.

A comparative genomics target prediction approach suggests that the mRNAs of eleven additional iron containing proteins are controlled by RyhB in Escherichia coli. Two of those (erpA, nirB) and two additional targets that are not directly related to iron (nagZ, marA) were verified with a GFP reporter system.

It has been shown that RyhB has a role in targeting the polycistronic transcript iscRSUA for differential degradation. RyhB binds to the second cistron of iscRSUA, which encodes machinery for biosynthesis of Fe-S clusters. This binding promotes cleavage of the downstream iscSUA transcript. This cleavage leaves the 5′ IscR transcript which is a transcriptional regulator responsible regulating several genes that depend on cellular Fe-S level.

More recent data indicate a potential dual function role for RyhB. In this capacity it may act both as an RNA-RNA interaction based regulator and as a transcript encoding for a small protein.

RyhB is analogous to PrrF RNA found in Pseudomonas aeruginosa, to HrrF RNA in Haemophilus species and to IsaR1 in cyanobacteria.

First sRNA shown to mediate persistence to antibiotics in E.coli. The finding may lead to discovery of novel treatments for persistent infections.

== Naming ==
The RyhB gene name is an acronym composed of R for RNA, y for unknown function (after the protein naming convention), with the h representing the ten-minute-interval section of the E. coli map the gene is found in. The B comes from the fact that this was one of two RNA genes identified in this interval. Other RNAs using this nomenclature include RydB RNA, RyeB RNA, RyeE RNA and RyfA RNA.
