= SraC/RyeA RNA =

Non-coding RNA in E. coli

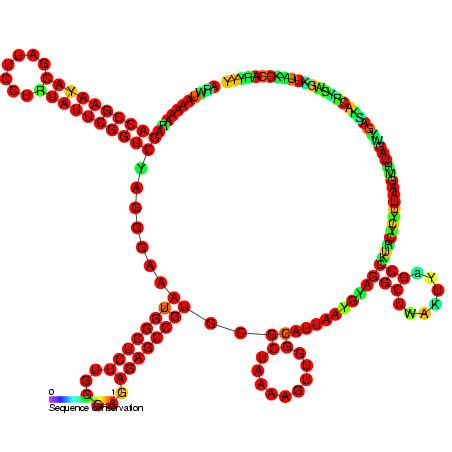
- Predicted secondary structure and sequence conservation of SraC_RyeA

Identifiers
- Symbol: SraC_RyeA
- Rfam: RF00101

Other data
- RNA type: Gene; sRNA
- Domain: Bacteria
- SO: SO:0000655
- PDB structures: PDBe

The SraC/RyeA RNA is a non-coding RNA that was discovered in E. coli during two large scale screens for RNAs. The function of this RNA is currently unknown. This RNA overlaps the SdsR/RyeB RNA on the opposite strand suggesting that the two RNAs may act in a concerted manner.
