= MicF RNA =

Gene found in bacteria

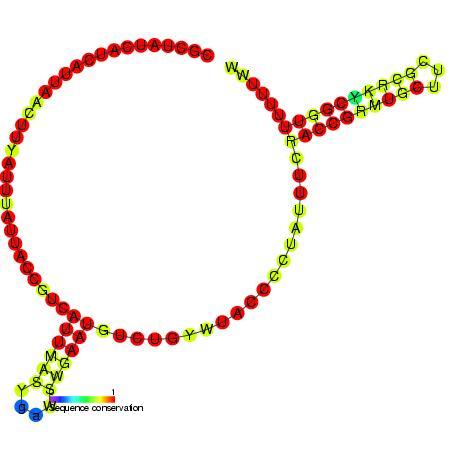
- Predicted secondary structure and sequence conservation of MicF

Identifiers
- Symbol: MicF
- Rfam: RF00033

Other data
- RNA type: Gene; antisense
- Domain(s): Bacteria
- GO: GO:0006950 GO:0003729
- SO: SO:0000383
- PDB structures: PDBe

The micF RNA is a non-coding RNA stress response gene found in Escherichia coli and related bacteria that post-transcriptionally controls expression of the outer membrane porin gene ompF. The micF gene encodes a non-translated 93 nucleotide antisense RNA that binds its target ompF mRNA and regulates ompF expression by inhibiting translation and inducing degradation of the message. In addition, other factors, such as the RNA chaperone protein StpA also play a role in this regulatory system. The expression of micF is controlled by both environmental and internal stress factors. Four transcriptional regulators are known to bind the micF promoter region and activate micF expression.

== Species distribution ==
Homologues of MicF RNA have been characterised by Southern blotting in a variety of bacteria including Salmonella typhimurium, Klebsiella pneumoniae, and Pseudomonas aeruginosa. MicF has also been identified computationally in Yersinia pestis and Yersinia enterocolitica.
