= MicA RNA =

SraD RNA
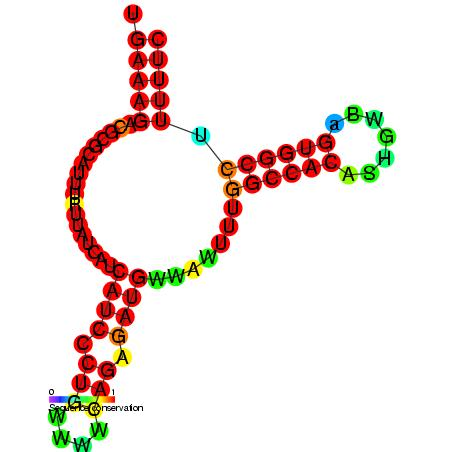
- Predicted secondary structure and sequence conservation of SraD

Identifiers
- Symbol: SraD
- Alt. Symbols: sraD
- Rfam: RF00078

Other data
- RNA type: Gene; sRNA
- Domain: Bacteria
- SO: SO:0000655
- PDB structures: PDBe

The MicA RNA (also known as SraD) is a small non-coding RNA that was discovered in E. coli during a large scale screen. Expression of SraD is highly abundant in stationary phase, but low levels could be detected in exponentially growing cells as well.

== Function ==
This RNA binds the Hfq protein and regulates levels of gene expression by an antisense mechanism. It is known to target the OmpA gene in E. coli and occludes the ribosome binding site. Under conditions of envelope stress, micA transcription is induced. MicA, RybB RNA and MicL RNA transcription is under the control of the sigma factor sigma(E). In E.coli, SraD also interacts in cis and trans with the mRNA species, luxS, ompA and phoP, respectively. This observation describes MicA to be the first known sRNA to carry out antisense regulation in both structural configurations. MicA is known to interact with the mRNA encoding the quorum sensing synthase homolog, LuxS in E.coli and both RNAs are processed by the double stranded RNA endonuclease, RNase III. Based on its conservation, this is presumably the case in close relatives and may serve as a long elusive link between envelope stress and quorum sensing.

The PhoPQ two-component system is repressed by MicA. The RNA presumably pairs with the ribosomal binding site of phoP mRNA, thereby inhibiting translation. This links micA to cellular processes such as Mg(2+) transport, virulence, LPS modifications and resistance to antimicrobial peptides.

In S. typhimurium MicA has been shown to be involved in biofilm formation. It is observed that the luxS mutant biofilm formation process is found to be dependent on MicA in cases where the gene's coding region is deleted, however, it is still not known to what extent MicA is involved in this mechanism.

Site directed mutagenesis has been used to construct mutated forms of MicA forms in order to investigate the RNA determinants important to its stability and function. Each 'domain' investigated ( 5′linear domain, the structured region with two stem-loops, the A/U-rich sequence and the 3′ poly(U) tail) was altered without affecting the overall secondary structure of MicA however, each 'domain' was found to have a different impact on stability and the ability of MicA to regulate its multiple targets.
