= Shigella flexneri =

- Scanning electron micrograph

Scientific classification
- Domain: Bacteria
- Kingdom: Pseudomonadati
- Phylum: Pseudomonadota
- Class: Gammaproteobacteria
- Order: Enterobacterales
- Family: Enterobacteriaceae
- Genus: Shigella
- Species: S. flexneri

Binomial name
- Shigella flexneri Castellani & Chalmers 1919

Species of bacterium

Shigella flexneri is a species of Gram-negative bacteria in the genus Shigella that can cause diarrhea in humans. Several different serogroups of Shigella are described; S. flexneri belongs to group B. S. flexneri infections which can usually be treated with antibiotics, although some strains have become resistant. Less severe cases are not usually treated because they become more resistant in the future. Shigella are closely related to Escherichia coli, but can be differentiated from E.coli based on pathogenicity, physiology (failure to ferment lactose or decarboxylate lysine) and serology.

== Discovery ==
The species was named after the American physician Simon Flexner; the genus Shigella is named after Japanese physician Kiyoshi Shiga, who researched the cause of dysentery. Shiga entered the Tokyo Imperial University School of Medicine in 1892, during which he attended a lecture by Shibasaburo Kitasato. After graduating, Shiga went to work for Kitasato as a research assistant at Institute for Infectious Diseases. In 1897, Shiga focused his efforts on what the Japanese referred to as a "Sekiri" (dysentery) outbreak. These epidemics occurred often in the late 19th century. The 1897 sekiri epidemic affected >91,000, with a mortality rate of >20%. Shiga studied 32 dysentery patients and used Koch's Postulates to successfully isolate and identify the bacterium causing the disease. He continued to study and characterize the bacterium, identifying its methods of toxin production i.e. Shiga toxin, and worked tirelessly to create a vaccine for the disease.

== Characterization ==
=== Morphology ===
Shigella flexneri is a rod shaped, nonflagellar bacterium that relies on actin-based motility. It produces the protein actin in a swift and continuous fashion to propel itself forward within and between the host's cells. This bacterium is gram-negative, non-spore forming Shigella from serogroup B. There are 6 serotypes within this serogroup.

=== Serotype ===
Shigella flexneri belongs to group B (i.e. agglutinate with B antisera) which further subclassified by six type-specific and four group-specific antisera. Until now at least 23 different subserotypes have been identified and reported. PCR based molecular serotyping technique are now available targeting wzx1-5 (All except serotype 6) and gtr genes or wzx6 (Only serotype 6).

Serotype	Previously designated name	Type antigen specific antisera (MASF)						MASF	Group antigen specific antisera (MASF)			
Serotype	Previously designated name	I	II	IV-2	V	VI	Ic	B	Y-5	6	7,8	IV-I
S. flexneri 1a	1a	+						+	+			
S. flexneri 1b	1b	+						+		+		
S. flexneri 1d	1d	+						+			+	
S. flexneri 2a	2a		+					+	+			
S. flexneri 2b	2b		+					+			+	
S. flexneri 3a	3a							+		+	+	
S. flexneri 3b	3b							+		+		
S. flexneri 4a	4a			+				+	+			
S. flexneri 4b	4b			+				+		+		
S. flexneri 4c	4c			+				+			+	
S. flexneri 4d	type4			+				+				+
S. flexneri 4e	4a, 4av			+				+	+			+
S. flexneri 5a	5a				+			+	+			
S. flexneri 5b	5b				+			+			+	
S. flexneri 6a	type 6					+		+				
S. flexneri 6b	type 6					+		+				+
S. flexneri 7a	1c						+	+				
S. flexneri 7b	1c+6						+	+		+		
S. flexneri Xa	X							+			+	
S. flexneri Xb	Xv							+			+	+
S. flexneri Ya	Y							+	+			
S. flexneri Yb	Yv							+	+			+
S. flexneri Z	4X, 4s							+				+

=== Invasion ===
Shigella flexneri is an intracellular bacterium that infects the epithelial lining of the mammalian intestinal tract. This bacterium is acid tolerant and can survive conditions of pH 2. Thus, it is able to enter the mouth of its host and survive passage through the stomach to the colon. Once inside of the colon, S. flexneri can penetrate the epithelium in three ways: 1) The bacterium can alter the tight junctions between the epithelial cells, allowing it to cross into the sub-mucosa. 2) It can penetrate the highly endocytic M cells that are dispersed in the epithelial layer and cross into the sub-mucosa. 3) After reaching the sub-mucosa, the bacteria can be phagocytosed by macrophages and induce apoptosis, cell death. This releases cytokines that recruit polymorphonuclear cells (PMN) to the sub-mucosa. S. flexneri still in the lumen of the colon traverse the epithelial lining as the PMNs cross into the infected area. The influx of PMN cells across the epithelial layer in response to Shigella disrupts the integrity of the epithelium allowing lumenal bacteria to cross into the sub-mucosa in an M-cell independent mechanism. S. flexneri uses these three methods to reach the sub-mucosa to penetrate the epilithelial cells from the basolateral side. The bacterium has four known invasion plasmid antigens: IpaA, IpaB, IpaC, and IpaD. When S. flexneri makes contact with the basolateral side of an epithelial cell, IpaC and IpaB are fused together to make a pore in the epithelial cell membrane. It then uses a type-III secretion system (T3SS) to insert the other Ipa proteins into the cytoplasm of the epithelial cell. S. flexneri can pass to neighboring epithelial cells by using its own outer membrane protein, IcsA, to activate the host's actin assembly machinery. The IcsA protein is first localized to one pole of the bacterium where it will then bind with the host's protein, Neural Wiskott–Aldrich Syndrome Protein (N-WASP). This IcsA/N-WASP complex then activates the Actin-related protein (Arp) 2/3 Complex. Arp 2/3 Complex is the protein responsible for rapidly initiating actin polymerization and propelling the bacteria forward. When S. flexneri reaches the adjoining membrane, it creates a protrusion into the neighboring cell's cytoplasm. The bacteria becomes surrounded by two layers of cellular membrane. It then uses another IpaBC complex to make a pore and enter the next cell. VacJ is a protein that is also needed by S. flexneri to exit the protrusion. Its exact function is still being studied but it is known that intercellular spread is greatly impaired without it. Bacterial replication within the epithelial cell is detrimental to the cell but it is proposed that epithelial cell death is largely due to the host's own inflammatory response.

=== Genetics ===
The genome of S. flexneri and Escherichia coli are nearly indistinguishable at the species level. S. flexneri has a circular chromosome with 4,599,354 base pairs. It is smaller than that of E. coli but the genes are similar. S. flexneri has about 4,084 known genes in the genome. The extensive similarity between E. coli and S. flexneri is proposed to be due to horizontal transfer. All of the genes needed for S. flexneri to invade the epithelial lining of the colon are found on a virulence plasmid called pINV. The genome of pINV is highly conserved between subspecies of S. flexneri. S. flexneri also has two other small multicopy plasmids, but some strains of S. flexneri have more plasmids that are suspected to confer antibiotic resistance. Some strains of S. flexneri have resistance to the antibiotics streptomycin, ampicillin, or trimethoprim. It has been found that chloramphenicol, nalidixic acid, and gentamicin are still effective antibiotics for some strains.

=== Metabolism ===
Shigella flexneri is a heterotroph. It utilizes the Embden–Meyerhof–Parnas (EMP), Entner–Doudoroff (ED), or pentose phosphate pathway (PPP) to metabolize sugars. The products of these pathways then feed into the Citric Acid Cycle (TCA). S. flexneri can metabolize glucose and pyruvate. Supplemented pyruvate allows for the most growth and is believed to be the preferred carbon source. Pyruvate could be supplied by the cell's own metabolism or taken from the host cell. S. flexneri is a facultative anaerobe that is able to perform mixed-acid fermentation of pyruvate. S. flexneri is unable to ferment lactose. This bacterium grows optimally at 37 °C but can grow in temperatures as low as 30 °C.

=== Small RNA ===
Bacterial small RNAs play important roles in many cellular processes. RnaG and RyhB sRNAs have been well studied in S. flexneri. Ssr1 sRNA, which could play role in resistance to acidic stress and regulation of virulence was shown to exist only in Shigella.

== Infectious cycle ==
Shigella flexneri contains a virulence plasmid that codes for three virulence factors: a type-3 secretion system (T3SS), invasion plasmid antigen proteins (IPA proteins), and IcsA (used for cell-to-cell spread).

Upon infection, S. flexneri injects the host cell cytoplasm with ipa proteins using the T3SS—a needle-and-syringe-like apparatus common to many Gram-negative pathogens. These ipa proteins induce "membrane ruffling" by the host cell. Membrane ruffling creates membrane pockets which capture and engulf the bacteria. Once inside, S. flexneri uses host cell actin for propulsion to move directly from cell to cell using a cellular mechanism known as paracytophagy, similarly to the bacterial pathogen Listeria monocytogenes.

Shigella flexneri is able to inhibit the acute inflammatory response in the initial stage of infection by using an effector protein, OspI, which is encoded by ORF169b on the Shigella large plasmid and secreted by the type III secretion system. It dampens the inflammatory response during bacterial invasion by suppressing the TNF-α-receptor-associated factor 6 (TRAF6)-mediated signalling pathway. OspI has glutamine deamidase activity, and is able to selectively deaminate glutamine at position 100 in UBC13 to glutamate, and this results in a failure of the E2 ubiquitin-conjugating activity which is required for TRAF6 activation.

Shigella flexneri host cells have created a way by which they try to prevent the bacteria from moving by preventing the bacteria actin based motility. This happens by inducing septin-cage formation inside the cells and trapping the bacteria so that they are immobilized, their reproduction is inhibited and the bacteria are targeted for autophagy. The shigella T3SS is regulated by various effector proteins. From these the kinase effector OspG has been proven to facilitate escaping from the septic-cage. The injection of the effector protein into the host cells reduces CAND1 (substrate introducing protein) association with the Cullin-RING-ubiquitin ligases (CRLs) (E3 ubiquitin-ligases) due to phosphorylation by the OspG kinase effector. This leads to an altered ubiquitination landscape in the cells as right substrate proteins are not introduces. The altered ubiquitination has proven to affect also septins by inducing their ubiquitination compared to non-infected state. This ubiquitination prevents them from forming higher filamentous septin structures needed for septin-ring formation as the septin monomers cannot interact normally with each other. This is just one of the factors which highlight the T3SS effect on evading the host cell immune responses.
