= Bacterial small RNA =

Bacterial small RNAs are small RNAs produced by bacteria; they are 50- to 500-nucleotide non-coding RNA molecules, highly structured and containing several stem-loops. Numerous sRNAs have been identified using both computational analysis and laboratory-based techniques such as Northern blotting, microarrays and RNA-Seq in a number of bacterial species including Escherichia coli, the model pathogen Salmonella, the nitrogen-fixing alphaproteobacterium Sinorhizobium meliloti, marine cyanobacteria, Francisella tularensis (the causative agent of tularaemia), Streptococcus pyogenes, the pathogen Staphylococcus aureus, and the plant pathogen Xanthomonas oryzae pathovar oryzae. Bacterial sRNAs affect how genes are expressed within bacterial cells via interaction with mRNA or protein, and thus can affect a variety of bacterial functions like metabolism, virulence, environmental stress response, and structure.

== Origin ==
In the 1960s, the abbreviation sRNA was used to refer to "soluble RNA," which is now known as transfer RNA or tRNA (for an example of the abbreviation used in this sense, see). It is now known that most bacterial sRNAs are encoded by free-standing genes located in the intergenic regions (IGR) between two known genes. However, a class of sRNAs are shown to be derived from the 3'-UTR of mRNAs by independent transcription or nucleolytic cleavage.

The first bacterial sRNA was discovered and characterized in 1984. MicF in E. coli was found to regulate the expression of a key structural gene that makes up the outer membrane of the E. coli cell. Shortly after, the Staphylococcus aureus sRNA RNAIII was found to act as a global regulator of S. aureus virulence and toxin secretion. Since these initial discoveries, over six thousand bacterial sRNAs have been identified, largely through RNA-sequencing experiments.

== Techniques ==
Several laboratory and bioinformatic techniques can be used to identify and characterize sRNA transcripts.

- RNA-sequencing, or RNA-seq, is used to analyze expression levels of all transcripts in a genome, including sRNAs.
- Microarrays use complementary DNA probes to bind to possible sRNA loci in intergenic regions.
- Northern blotting can reveal possible sRNA transcript size and expression levels by running a mixed RNA sample on an agarose gel and probing for a desired sRNA.
- Target prediction software can predict possible interactions between sRNAs and mRNA by finding regions of complementarity within sRNA and mRNA target sequences.
- RNase crosslinking can experimentally validate sRNA and mRNA interactions by crosslinking a sRNA and its target with UV light, along with RNase enzymes that are also usually involved in the interaction. The sRNA:mRNA hybrid can then be isolated and analyzed.

== Function ==
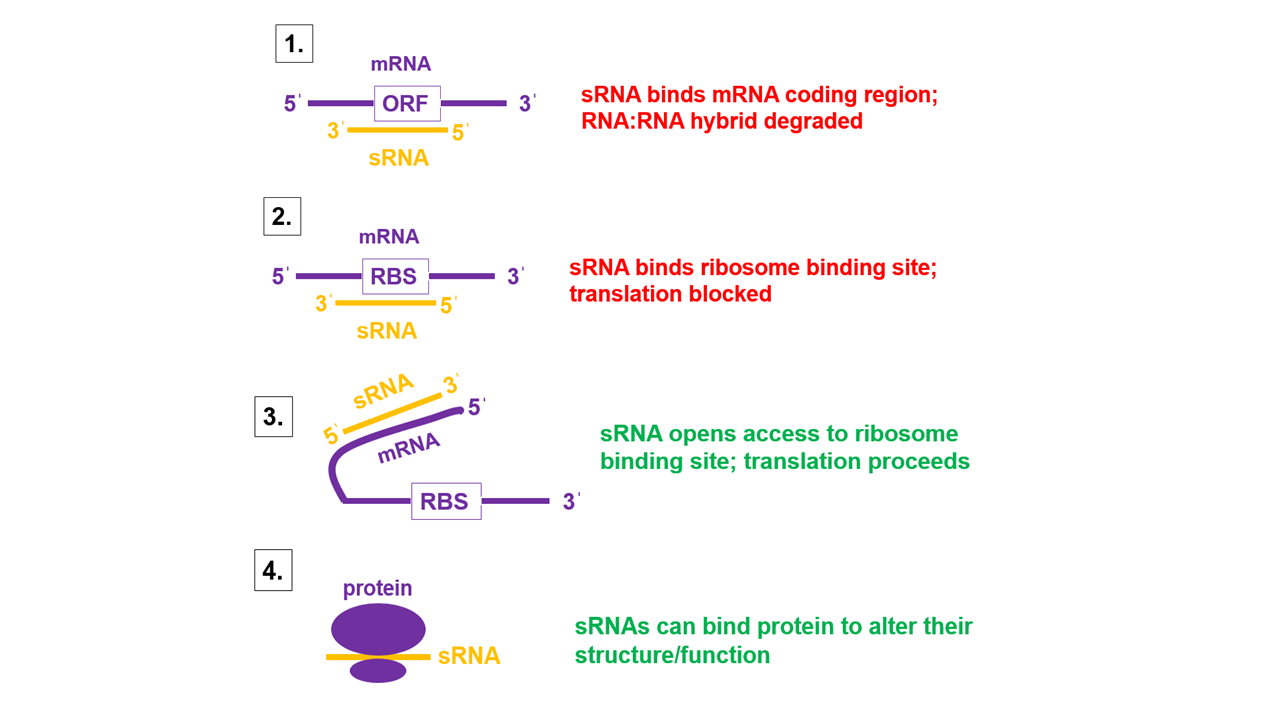
Four common mechanisms of bacterial sRNA interaction with mRNA or protein targets.

Bacterial sRNAs have a wide variety of regulatory mechanisms. Generally, sRNAs can bind to protein targets and modify the function of the bound protein. Alternately, sRNAs may interact with mRNA targets and regulate gene expression by binding to complementary mRNA and blocking translation, or by unmasking or blocking the ribosome-binding site.

sRNAs that interact with mRNA can also be categorized as cis- or trans-acting. Cis-acting sRNAs interact with genes encoded on the same genetic locus as the sRNA. Some cis-acting sRNAs act as riboswitches, which have receptors for specific environmental or metabolic signals and activate or repress genes based on these signals. Conversely, trans-encoded sRNAs interact with genes on separate loci.

=== House-keeping ===
Amongst the targets of sRNAs are a number of house-keeping genes. The 6S RNA binds to RNA polymerase and regulates transcription, tmRNA has functions in protein synthesis, including the recycling of stalled ribosomes, 4.5S RNA regulates signal recognition particle (SRP), which is required for the secretion of proteins and RNase P is involved in maturing tRNAs.

=== Stress response ===
Many sRNAs are involved in stress response regulation. They are expressed under stress conditions such as cold shock, iron depletion, onset of the SOS response and sugar stress. The small RNA ryfA has been found to affect the stress response of uropathogenic E.coli, under osmotic and oxidative stress. The small RNA nitrogen stress-induced RNA 1 (NsiR1) is produced by Cyanobacteria under conditions of nitrogen deprivation. Cyanobacteria NisR8 and NsiR9 sRNAs could be related to the differentiation of nitrogen-fixing cells (heterocysts).

=== Regulation of RpoS ===
The RpoS gene in E. coli encodes sigma 38, a sigma factor which regulates stress response and acts as a transcriptional regulator for many genes involved in cell adaptation. At least three sRNAs, DsrA, RprA and OxyS, regulate the translation of RpoS. DsrA and RprA both activate RpoS translation by base pairing to a region in the leader sequence of the RpoS mRNA and disrupting formation of a hairpin which frees up the ribosome loading site. OxyS inhibits RpoS translation. DsrA levels are increased in response to low temperatures and osmotic stress, and RprA levels are increased in response to osmotic stress and cell-surface stress, therefore increasing RpoS levels in response to these conditions. Levels of OxyS are increased in response to oxidative stress, therefore inhibiting RpoS under these conditions.

=== Regulation of outer membrane proteins ===
The outer membrane of gram negative bacteria acts as a barrier to prevent the entry of toxins into the bacterial cell, and plays a role in the survival of bacterial cells in diverse environments. Outer membrane proteins (OMPs) include porins and adhesins. Numerous sRNAs regulate the expression of OMPs. The porins OmpC and OmpF are responsible for the transport of metabolites and toxins. The expression of OmpC and OmpF is regulated by the sRNAs MicC and MicF in response to stress conditions. The outer membrane protein OmpA anchors the outer membrane to the murein layer of the periplasmic space. Its expression is downregulated in the stationary phase of cell-growth. In E. coli the sRNA MicA depletes OmpA levels, in Vibrio cholerae the sRNA VrrA represses synthesis of OmpA in response to stress.

=== Virulence ===
In some bacteria sRNAs regulate virulence genes. In Salmonella, the pathogenicity island encoded InvR RNA represses synthesis of the major outer membrane protein OmpD; another co-activated DapZ sRNA from 3'-UTR represses abundant membrane Opp/Dpp transporters of oligopeptides; and SgrS sRNA regulates the expression of the secreted effector protein SopD. In Staphylococcus aureus, RNAIII regulates a number of genes involved in toxin and enzyme production and cell-surface proteins. The FasX sRNA is the only well-characterized regulatory RNA known to control the regulation of several virulence factors in Streptococcus pyogenes, including both cell-surface associated adhesion proteins as well as secreted factors.

=== Quorum sensing ===
In Vibrio species, the Qrr sRNAs and the chaperone protein Hfq are involved in the regulation of quorum sensing. Qrr sRNAs regulate the expression of several mRNAs including the quorum-sensing master regulators LuxR and HapR.

=== Biofilm Formation ===
Biofilm is a type of bacterial growth pattern where multiple layers of bacterial cells adhere to a host surface. This mode of growth is often found in pathogenic bacteria, including Pseudomonas aeruginosa, which can form persistent biofilm within the respiratory tract and cause chronic infection. The P. aeruginosa sRNA SbrA was found to be necessary for full biofilm formation and pathogenicity. A mutant P. aeruginosa strain with SbrA deleted formed a 66% smaller biofilm and its ability to infect a nematode model was reduced by nearly half when compared to wildtype P. aeruginosa.

=== Antibiotic Resistance ===
Several bacterial sRNAs are involved in the regulation of genes that confer antibiotic resistance. For example, the sRNA DsrA regulates a drug efflux pump in E. coli, which is a system that mechanically pumps antibiotic out of bacterial cells. E. coli MicF also contributes to antibiotic resistance of cephalosporins, as it regulates membrane proteins involved in uptake of these class of antibiotics.

== Target prediction ==
In order to understand an sRNA's function one primarily needs to describe its targets. Here, target predictions represent a fast and free method for initial characterization of putative targets, given that the sRNA actually exerts its function via direct base pairing with a target RNA. Examples are CopraRNA, IntaRNA, TargetRNA and RNApredator. It has been shown that target prediction for enterobacterial sRNAs can benefit from transcriptome wide Hfq-binding maps.

== Databases ==
- BSRD (kwanlab.bio.cuhk.edu.hk/BSRD) is a repository for published sRNA sequences with multiple annotations and expression profiles.
- SRD (srd.genouest.org/) is a database of Staphylococcus aureus sRNAs with sequences, predicted structures, and genome start and end sites.
- sRNAdb (http://srnadb.fb11.uni-giessen.de/sRNAdb) is a database of sRNAs from Gram-positive bacterial species with sequence annotation.

== See also ==
- 5 prime ureB sRNA
- Aar small RNA, an sRNA produced by species of Acinetobacter
- AfaR small RNA, a small RNA produced by the bacterium Escherichia coli.
- Bacillus subtilis BSR sRNAs
- Escherichia coli sRNA
- Mycobacterium tuberculosis sRNA
- Bacteroides thetaiotaomicron sRNA
- Non-coding RNA
- Xanthomonas sRNA
- Brucella sRNA
- Anti small RNA
- Riboswitches
- Streptococcus sRNA
- MicF, the first characterized chromosomal sRNA
- RNAIII, the first characterized bacterial sRNA found to influence virulence
- VR-RNA, a small RNA produced by Clostridium perfringens.
