= Cyanobacterial non-coding RNA =

In molecular biology, Cyanobacterial non-coding RNAs are non-coding RNAs which have been identified in species of cyanobacteria. Large scale screens have identified 21 Yfr (cyanobacterial functional RNAs) in the marine cyanobacterium Prochlorococcus and related species such as Synechococcus. These include the Yfr1 and Yfr2 RNAs. In Prochlorococcus and Synechocystis, non-coding RNAs have been shown to regulate gene expression. NsiR4, widely conserved throughout the cyanobacterial phylum, has been shown to be involved in nitrogen assimilation control in Synechocystis sp. PCC 6803 and in the filamentous, nitrogen-fixing Anabaena sp. PCC 7120.

PsrR1 (photosynthesis regulatory RNA1), formerly known as Syr1 discovered in Synechocystis sp PCC 6803, is a regulatory factor controlling photosynthetic functions. Interactions between PsrR1 and the ribosome binding regions of several photosynthesis-related mRNAs have been confirmed. In particular, it has been shown that psaL mRNA is processed by RNase E only in the presence of PsrR1.

== See also ==
- Bacillus subtilis BSR sRNAs
- Bacterial small RNA
- Brucella sRNA
- Cyanobacteria
- Cyanobacterial RNA thermometer
- Escherichia coli sRNA
- Mycobacterium tuberculosis sRNA
- NsiR4
- Pseudomonas sRNA
- Yfr1 RNA
- Yfr2 RNA
