= Xanthomonas sRNA =

In molecular biology, Xanthomonas sRNA are small RNAs which have been identified in various species of the bacterium Xanthomonas.

Analysis of the plant pathogen Xanthomonas campestris pv. vesicatoria revealed expression of seven cis-encoded antisense RNAs (asX1-asX7) and 15 intergenic sRNAs (sX1 - sX15). Several sRNAs have also been identified in Xanthomonas campestris pathovar campestris. Some of these X. campestris sRNAs are only found in Xanthomonas, some are also expressed in other bacteria. Several of these sRNAs appear to contribute to virulence, including sX12, sX13 and sRNA-Xcc1.

Computational analysis predicts 63 sRNAs in Xanthomonas oryzae pathovar oryzae, expression of 8 of these has been experimentally confirmed. Expression of three of these is Hfq-dependent.

== See also ==
- Bacillus subtilis BSR sRNAs
- Bacterial small RNA
- Escherichia coli sRNA
- Mycobacterium tuberculosis sRNA
- Pseudomonas sRNA
