= YFR (disambiguation) =

YFR may refer to:

- A US Navy hull classification symbol: Refrigerated covered barge (YFR)
- YFR - Fort Resolution Airport in the Northwest Territories.
- YFR - Yeshiva of Far Rockaway, also called Yeshiva Derech Ayson, is a yeshiva in Far Rockaway, Queens.
- YFR - cYanobacterial Functional RNA such as Yfr1 and Yfr2
