= Bacteroides thetaiotaomicron sRNA =

GibS
- Consensus secondary structure and sequence conservation of GibS sRNA

Identifiers
- Symbol: GibS
- Rfam: RF04182

Other data
- RNA type: Gene; sRNA
- SO: SO:0000655
- PDB structures: PDBe

The Bacteroides thetaiotaomicron genome contains hundreds of small RNAs (sRNAs), discovered through RNA sequencing. These include canonical housekeeping RNA species such as the 6S RNA (SsrS), tmRNA (SsrA), M1 RNA (RnpB) and 4.5S RNA (Ffs) as well as several hundred cis and trans encoded small RNAs. More than 20 candidates have been validated with northern blots and the structures of several members have been characterized through in silico analyses and chemical probing experiments.

Two B. thetaiotaomicron sRNAs that have been functionally characterized are RteR and GibS. RteR is a 78 nucleotide (nt) long sRNA that is conserved in closely related species and likely serves as a repressor of a transposon operon. Analyses based on secondary structure conservation, taking into consideration nucleotide covariation and in-vitro chemical probing have revealed a structure that consists of a 5’ hairpin and a Rho-independent terminator that are separated by an 8 nt sequence. GibS is a 145 nt long sRNA that is also conserved in several closely related species within phylum Bacteroidota and has been hypothesized to play a role in carbon metabolism. Structural analyses have revealed this sRNA to possess an extended 5’ single stranded region (38 nt) followed by two meta-stable hairpins and a Rho-independent terminator at the 3’ end. It is maximally expressed when B. thetaiotaomicron is grown in N-acetyl-D-glucosamine as the sole carbon source and has been shown to both induce and repress target mRNAs involved in metabolic regulation.

The B. thetaiotaomicron genome also contains a large subset of antisense sRNAs that bear resemblance to the Bacteroides fragilis DonS RNA. This family of 78 to 128 nt long sRNAs are encoded antisense to several of their target genes, that are members of PULs (Polysaccharide Utilization Loci).

== See also ==
- Bacillus subtilis sRNAs
- Bacterial small RNA
- Brucella sRNA
- Caenorhabditis elegans sRNA
- Escherichia coli sRNA
- Pseudomonas sRNA
