= Brucella sRNA =

Bacterial small RNAs (sRNA) are an important class of regulatory molecules in bacteria such as Brucella. They are often bound to the chaperone protein Hfq, which allows them to interact with mRNA(s). In Brucella suis 1330 RNA sequencing identified a novel list of 33 sRNAs and 62 Hfq-associated mRNAs. In Brucella melitensis eight novel sRNA genes were identified using bioinformatic and experimental approach. One of them BSR0602 was found to modulate the intracellular survival of B. melitensis. In another large-scale deep sequencing study 1321 sRNAs were identified in B. melitensis. BSR0441 sRNA was further investigated in this study and shown to play role in the intracellular survival. sRNA BM-sr0117 from Brucella melitensis was identified and shown to be bound to and cleaved by Bm-RNase III. AbcR and AbcR2 (orthologs of SmrC15 and SmrC16) were studied B. abortus. Seven novel sRNAs were validated and their interaction with a putative target sequence was verified in B. abortus.

== RNA chaperone Hfq link to Brucella virulence ==
Hfq protein regulates virB operon which is required for full virulence of the bacteria. It can bind to 5' untranslated region of virB transcriptional regulator BabR and mediate its effects on babR expression.

== See also ==
- Bacillus subtilis BSR sRNAs
- Escherichia coli sRNA
- Mycobacterium tuberculosis sRNA
- Non-coding RNA
- Xanthomonas sRNA
