= (glutamate—ammonia-ligase) adenylyltransferase =

Class of enzymes

[glutamate—ammonia-ligase] adenylyltransferase

Identifiers
- EC no.: 2.7.7.42
- CAS no.: 9077-66-1

Databases
- IntEnz: IntEnz view
- BRENDA: BRENDA entry
- ExPASy: NiceZyme view
- KEGG: KEGG entry
- MetaCyc: metabolic pathway
- PRIAM: profile
- PDB structures: RCSB PDB PDBe PDBsum
- Gene Ontology: AmiGO / QuickGO
Search
- PMC: articles
- PubMed: articles
- NCBI: proteins

In enzymology, a [glutamate—ammonia-ligase] adenylyltransferase (EC 2.7.7.42) is an enzyme that catalyzes the chemical reaction

ATP + [L-glutamate:ammonia ligase (ADP-forming)] $\rightleftharpoons$ diphosphate + adenylyl-[L-glutamate:ammonia ligase (ADP-forming)]

Thus, the two substrates of this enzyme are ATP and L-glutamate:ammonia ligase (ADP-forming), whereas its two products are diphosphate and adenylyl-[L-glutamate:ammonia ligase (ADP-forming)].

This enzyme belongs to the family of transferases, specifically those transferring phosphorus-containing nucleotide groups (nucleotidyltransferases). The systematic name of this enzyme class is ATP:[L-glutamate:ammonia ligase (ADP-forming)] adenylyltransferase. Other names in common use include glutamine-synthetase adenylyltransferase, ATP:glutamine synthetase adenylyltransferase, and adenosine triphosphate:glutamine synthetase adenylyltransferase.

== Structural studies ==
As of late 2007, only one structure has been solved for this class of enzymes, with the PDB accession code 1V4A.
