= Adenylyl-(glutamate—ammonia ligase) hydrolase =

Enzyme

adenylyl-[glutamate-ammonia ligase] hydrolase

Identifiers
- EC no.: 3.1.4.15
- CAS no.: 37288-22-5

Databases
- IntEnz: IntEnz view
- BRENDA: BRENDA entry
- ExPASy: NiceZyme view
- KEGG: KEGG entry
- MetaCyc: metabolic pathway
- PRIAM: profile
- PDB structures: RCSB PDB PDBe PDBsum
- Gene Ontology: AmiGO / QuickGO
Search
- PMC: articles
- PubMed: articles
- NCBI: proteins

In enzymology, an adenylyl-[glutamate---ammonia ligase] hydrolase (EC 3.1.4.15) is an enzyme that catalyzes the chemical reaction

adenylyl-[L-glutamate:ammonia ligase (ADP-forming)] + H_{2}O $\rightleftharpoons$ adenylate + [L-glutamate:ammonia ligase (ADP-forming)]

Thus, the two substrates of this enzyme are [[adenylyl-[L-glutamate:ammonia ligase (ADP-forming)]]] and H_{2}O, whereas its two products are adenylate and L-glutamate:ammonia ligase (ADP-forming).

This enzyme belongs to the family of hydrolases, specifically those acting on phosphoric diester bonds. The systematic name of this enzyme class is adenylyl-[L-glutamate:ammonia ligase (ADP-forming)] adenylylhydrolase. Other names in common use include adenylyl-[glutamine-synthetase]hydrolase, and adenylyl(glutamine synthetase) hydrolase.
