= Bacillus subtilis type I antitoxin SR6 =

RNA antitoxin

SR6 is a 100 nucleotide long antisense RNA antitoxin that overlaps 2 toxins: 3' end of yonT and yoyJ at its 5'end. In type I toxin-antitoxin (TA) systems the antitoxin is a small RNA that neutralizes a toxin protein. Several type I TA systems have been described in B. subtilis. YonT/SR6 system is located on the SPβ prophage of the B. subtilis chromosome and it was shown to be multi-stress responsive. SR6 acts by promoting yonT mRNA degradation. It may regulate the second toxin, yoyJ by a different mechanism.

== Other B. Subtilis type I TA systems ==
- txpA/RatA
- bsrG/SR4, bsrE/SR5
