= SrbA sRNA =

Small regulatory non-coding RNA

SrbA (sRNA regulator of biofilms A) is a small regulatory non-coding RNA identified in pathogenic Pseudomonas aeruginosa. It is important for biofilm formation and pathogenicity. Bacterial strain with deleted SrbA had reduced biofilm mass. As the ability to form biofilms can contribute to the ability a pathogen to thrive within the host, the C. elegans hosts infected with the srbA deleted strain displayed significantly lower mortality rate than the wild-type strain. However, the deletion of srbA had no effect on growth or antibiotic resistance in P. aeruginosa.

== See also ==
- NrsZ small RNA
- Pseudomonas sRNA
- AsponA antisense RNA
