= Cyano-S1 RNA motif =

cyano-S1
- Consensus secondary structure and sequence conservation of Cyanobacterial ribosomal protein S1 leader

Identifiers
- Symbol: cyano-S1
- Rfam: RF03151

Other data
- RNA type: Cis-reg; leader
- SO: SO:0000655
- PDB structures: PDBe

The Cyano-S1 RNA motif (originally named the Cyano-30S motif) is a conserved RNA structure present in some species of Cyanobacteria. Cyano-S1 RNAs are consistently found upstream of genes encoding ribosomal protein S1, a subunit of the ribosome. Therefore, they are presumed to be ribosomal protein leaders, i.e., cis-regulatory elements to which the ribosomal protein S1 binds, thereby controlling its expression levels.

== See also ==
- Cyano-2 RNA motif
- Yfr2
- Yfr1
