= NrsZ small RNA =

NrsZ sRNA
- Predicted secondary structure and sequence conservation of NrsZ small RNA

Identifiers
- Rfam: RF02695

Other data
- Domain: Bacteria
- GO: GO:0071978
- SO: SO:0000370
- PDB structures: PDBe

NrsZ (nitrogen regulated small RNA) is a bacterial small RNA found in the opportunistic pathogen Pseudomonas aeruginosa PAO1. Its transcription is induced during nitrogen limitation by the NtrB/C two-component system (an important regulator of nitrogen assimilation and swarming motility) together with the alternative sigma factor RpoN ( a global regulator involved in nitrogen metabolism). NrsZ by activating rhlA (a gene essential for rhamnolipids synthesis) positively regulates the production of rhamnolipid surfactants needed for swarming motility.

== See also ==
- Pseudomonas sRNA
- SrbA sRNA
- AsponA antisense RNA
