= Cyano-2 RNA motif =

- Consensus secondary structure of Cyano-2 RNAs

Identifiers
- Symbol: Cyano-2
- Rfam: RF01702

Other data
- RNA type: sRNA
- Domain: Synechococcus
- PDB structures: PDBe

The Cyano-2 RNA motif is a conserved RNA structure identified by bioinformatics. Cyano-2 RNAs are found in cyanobacterial species classified within the genus Synechococcus. Many terminal loops in the two conserved stem-loops contain the nucleotide sequence GCGA, and these sequences might in some cases form stable GNRA tetraloops. Since the two stem-loops are somewhat distant from one another it is possible that they represent two independent non-coding RNAs that are often or always co-transcribed. The region one thousand base pairs upstream of predicted Cyano-2 RNAs is usually devoid of annotated features such as RNA or protein-coding genes. This absence of annotated genes within one thousand base pairs is relatively unusual within bacteria.

== See also ==
- Yfr1
- Yfr2
- Cyano-S1 RNA motif
