= Methionine sulfoximine =

L-Methionine sulfoximine

Names
- IUPAC name (2S)-2-Amino-4-(S-methylsulfonimidoyl)butanoic acid
- Other names L-Methionine sulfoximine; MSO

Identifiers
CAS Number	15985-39-4
3D model (JSmol)	Interactive image
Beilstein Reference	1725509
ChEBI	CHEBI:28490
ChemSpider	80339
ECHA InfoCard	100.157.661
EC Number	217-845-8
PubChem CID	89034
UNII	M9P6YZ6JX9
CompTox Dashboard (EPA)	DTXSID30936181
- InChI: InChI=1S/C5H12N2O3S/c1-11(7,10)3-2-4(6)5(8)9/h4,7H,2-3,6H2,1H3,(H,8,9)/t4-,11?/m0/s1 Key: SXTAYKAGBXMACB-DPVSGNNYSA-N
- SMILES: CS(=N)(=O)CC[C@@H](C(=O)O)N

Properties
Chemical formula	C_{5}H_{12}N_{2}O_{3}S
Molar mass	180.22 g·mol^{−1}

Related compounds
Related compounds	Buthionine sulfoximine Glufosinate
- Except where otherwise noted, data are given for materials in their standard state (at 25 °C [77 °F], 100 kPa). Infobox references

Methionine sulfoximine (MSO, also known as MetSox) is an irreversible glutamine synthetase inhibitor. It is the sulfoximine derivative of methionine with convulsant effects.

L-Methionine sulfoximine is composed of two different diastereomers, which are L-S-Methionine sulfoximine and L-R-Methionine sulfoximine. These affect the longevity of the mouse model for Lou Gehrig's disease. Overproduction of glutamate results to excitotoxicity, which kills the cell. Since methionine sulfoximine inhibits glutamate production in the brain, it prevents excitotoxicity, thus increasing the longevity of the mice.

In other models, methionine sulfoximine is a convulsant used in animal models of temporal lobe epilepsy. By irreversibly inhibiting glutamine synthetase, it prevents the breakdown of glutamate; the increased concentration of glutamate results in seizures. Low dose short-term MSO exposure, by contrast, attenuated seizures in a lithium-pilocarpine model of epilepsy.

== Mechanism of action ==
MSO is phosphorylated by glutamine synthetase. The resulting product acts as a transition state analog that is unable to diffuse from the active site, thereby inhibiting the enzyme.

Phosphorylation of MSO by glutamine synthetase
