= GlnALG operon =

The glnALG operon is an operon that regulates the nitrogen content of a cell. It codes for the structural gene glnA the two regulatory genes glnL and glnG. glnA encodes glutamine synthetase, an enzyme which catalyzes the conversion of glutamate and ammonia to glutamine, thereby controlling the nitrogen level in the cell. glnG encodes NR_{I} which regulates the expression of the glnALG operon at three promoters, which are glnAp1, glnAp2 located upstream of glnA) and glnLp (intercistronic glnA-glnL region). glnL encodes NR_{II} which regulates the activity of NR_{I}. No significant homology is found in Eukaryotes.

== Structure ==
The glnALG has three structural genes:

- glnA: encodes glutamine synthetase, an enzyme which catalyzes the conversion of glutamate and ammonia to glutamine.
- glnL: encodes NR_{II} , which regulates the activity of NR_{I}.
- glnG: encodes NR_{I} , which regulates the expression of glnALG operon at three promoters, which are glnAp1, glnAp2 and glnLp.

== Physiological significance of glnALG ==
glnALG operon, along with the glnD and glnF and their gene products, plays an extremely important role in regulating the nitrogen level inside the cell. It also plays a role in the ammonium (methylammonium) transport system (Amt). Hence it increases the ammonia content of the cell when grown on glutamine or glutamate.

Hence along with histidase, glnALG operon maintains homeostasis within the cell.

== Mechanism of Regulation ==
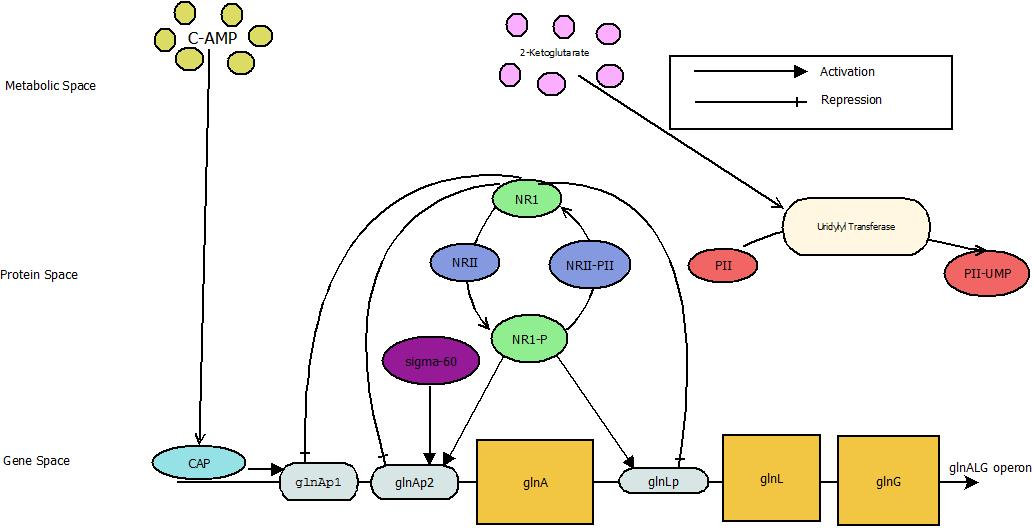
The picture depicts the mechanism of regulation of glnALG operon

The glnALG operon is regulated by an intricate network of repressors and activators. Along with NR_{I} and NR_{II}, there are gene products of glnF and glnD which play a key role in this network. The expression of the glnALG operon is regulated by the NRI at three promoters: glnAp1, glnAp2 and glnLp. The initiation of transcription at glnAp1 is stimulated exclusively under carbon starvation conditions and stationary phase during which cAMP accumulates in high concentration in the cell. The binding of cAMP to the catabolite activator protein (CAP) causes CAP to bind to a specific DNA site in glnAp1, and glnAp1 is repressed by NR_{I}. Initiation of transcription at glnAp2 requires the activated form of NR_{I}, i.e. NR_{I}–P(phosphorylated NR_{I}), as well as the glnF gene product, σ^{54}, and it is regulated by NR_{II}. NR_{II} in the presence of ATP, catalyzes the transfer of ϒ-phosphate of ATP to NR_{I}. In the presence of P_{II}, which is encoded by glnB, NR_{II} catalyzes the dephosphorylation of NR_{I}–P.

The nitrogen content in the cell is directly proportional to the ratio of concentration of glutamine to the concentration of 2-ketoglutarate. When nitrogen content is lower, the product of glnD gene, uridylyl transferase catalyzes the conversion of P_{II} to give P_{II}-UMP, hampering PII's ability of dephosphorylating NR_{I}–P. Uridylyl transferase catalyzes this reaction because the high concentration of 2-ketoglutarate allosterically activates it. In the case of high nitrogen, there is excess of NR_{I} which represses the transcription of the promoters glnAp1, glnAp2 and glnLp, which in turn represses the synthesis of glutamine synthetase.
