= TxpA–RatA toxin–antitoxin system =

RNA anti-toxin A
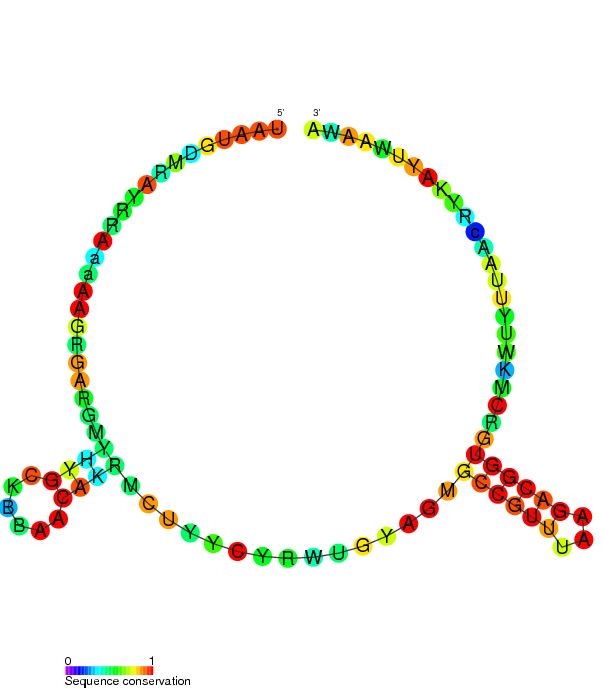
- Conserved secondary structure of RatA antitoxin sRNA.

Identifiers
- Symbol: RatA
- Rfam: RF01776

Other data
- RNA type: Antisense
- Domain: Bacillota
- PDB structures: PDBe

The TxpA/RatA toxin-antitoxin system was first identified in Bacillus subtilis. It consists of a non-coding 222nt sRNA called RatA (RNA anti-toxin A) and a protein toxin named TxpA (Toxic protein A).

RatA was discovered in intergenic regions of the B. subtilis genome, in a 728-nucleotide region between genes yqdB (later renamed TxpA) and yqbM. Initially, Affymetrix microarrays were used to detect transcription in this region, Northern blot experiments and mutation analysis were then employed to characterise the RNA transcript.

ratA and txpA are transcribed convergently, and have an overlap of 75 base pairs at their 3' ends, providing an area of complementarity. The RatA transcript binds with the TxpA mRNA across the complementary region and the dsRNA is then degraded by an uncharacterised RNase E equivalent, preventing translation of the toxic TxpA protein.

Genes ratA and txpA are found within a 48kb phage-like element called skin. This element interrupts a gene for the sigma factor σ^{K} and is excised during sporulation. The toxin-antitoxin system contained within skin forces the inheritance of this element, which is acting as a selfish gene.

The mechanism by which TxpA induces cell lysis and death is unknown. TxpA is not similar enough to other proteins of known function to infer a related function, however it does have a suspected transmembrane region in its N-terminal, so it is possible that TxpA damages the integrity of the cell membrane, or blocks cell wall synthesis.

== See also ==
- Toxin-antitoxin system
- Hok/sok system
- RdlD RNA
- Bacillus subtilis BSR sRNAs
- Bacillus subtilis type I antitoxin SR6
