= AsponA antisense RNA =

- Predicted secondary structure and sequence conservation of AsponA antisense RNA

Identifiers
- Rfam: RF02812

Other data
- Domain: Bacteria
- GO: GO:0046677
- SO: SO:0000077,SO:0000370
- PDB structures: PDBe

AsponA is a small asRNA transcribed antisense to the penicillin-binding protein 1A gene called ponA. It was identified by RNAseq and the expression was validated by 5' and 3' RACE experiments in Pseudomonas aeruginosa. AsponA expression was up or down regulated under different antibiotic stress. Owing to its location it may be able to prevent the transcription or translation of the opposite gene. Study by Wurtzel et al. and Ferrara et al. also detected its expression.

== See also ==
- NrsZ small RNA
- SrbA sRNA
- Pseudomonas sRNA
