= NsiR4 small RNA =

NsiR4 sRNA
- Predicted secondary structure and sequence conservation of PinT small RNA

Identifiers
- Rfam: RF002677

Other data
- Domain(s): Bacteria
- GO: GO:0010608
- SO: SO:0000370
- PDB structures: PDBe

NsiR4 (nitrogen stress-induced RNA 4), former name SyR12, is a cyanobacterial non-coding RNA which plays role in the regulation of Glutamine synthetase (GS), a key enzyme in biological nitrogen assimilation. NsiR4 interacts with the 5′UTR of the mRNA of the GS inactivating factor IF7 (gifA mRNA) and reduces its expression. NsiR4 expression is under positive control of the nitrogen control transcription factor (NtcA). NsR4 is a first example of an sRNA controlling the assimilation of a micronutrient.
