= Mycobacterium tuberculosis sRNA =

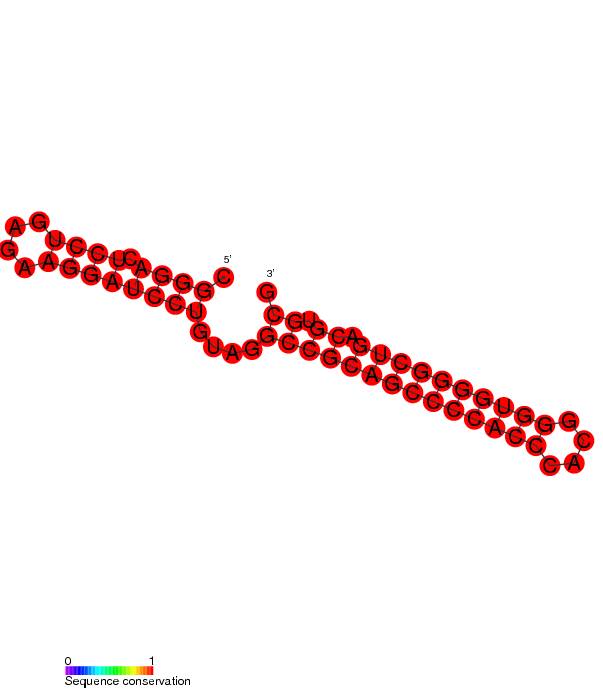
Secondary structure of b55, one of the sRNAs experimentally confirmed in M. tuberculosis

Mycobacterium tuberculosis contains at least nine small RNA families in its genome. The small RNA (sRNA) families were identified through RNomics – the direct analysis of RNA molecules isolated from cultures of Mycobacterium tuberculosis. The sRNAs were characterised through RACE mapping and Northern blot experiments. Secondary structures of the sRNAs were predicted using Mfold.

sRNAPredict2 – a bioinformatics tool – suggested 56 putative sRNAs in M. tuberculosis, though these have yet to be verified experimentally. Hfq protein homologues have yet to be found in M. tuberculosis; an alternative pathway – potentially involving conserved C-rich motifs – has been theorised to enable trans-acting sRNA functionality.

sRNAs were shown to have important physiological roles in M. tuberculosis. Overexpression of G2 sRNA, for example, prevented growth of M. tuberculosis and greatly reduced the growth of M. smegmatis; ASdes sRNA is thought to be a cis-acting regulator of a fatty acid desaturase (desA2) while ASpks is found with the open reading frame for Polyketide synthase-12 (pks12) and is an antisense regulator of pks12 mRNA.

The sRNA ncrMT1302 was found to be flanked by the MT1302 and MT1303 open reading frames. MT1302 encodes an adenylyl cyclase that converts ATP to cAMP, the expression of ncrMT1302 is regulated by cAMP and pH.

Mcr7 sRNA encoded by the mcr7 gene modulates translation of the tatC mRNA and impacts the activity of the Twin Arginine Translocation (Tat) protein secretion apparatus.

npcTB_6715 is a first sRNA identified as a potential biomarker for the detection of MTB in patients.

== See also ==
- Bacillus subtilis sRNAs
- Bacterial small RNA
- Brucella sRNA
- Bacteroides thetaiotaomicron sRNA
- Caenorhabditis elegans sRNA
- Escherichia coli sRNA
- Pseudomonaa sRNA
