= (protein-PII) uridylyltransferase =

Class of enzymes

[protein-PII] uridylyltransferase

Identifiers
- EC no.: 2.7.7.59
- CAS no.: 57657-57-5

Databases
- IntEnz: IntEnz view
- BRENDA: BRENDA entry
- ExPASy: NiceZyme view
- KEGG: KEGG entry
- MetaCyc: metabolic pathway
- PRIAM: profile
- PDB structures: RCSB PDB PDBe PDBsum
- Gene Ontology: AmiGO / QuickGO
Search
- PMC: articles
- PubMed: articles
- NCBI: proteins

In enzymology, a [protein-PII] uridylyltransferase (EC 2.7.7.59) is an enzyme that catalyzes the chemical reaction

UTP + [protein-PII] $\rightleftharpoons$ diphosphate + uridylyl-[protein-PII]

Thus, the two substrates of this enzyme are UTP and protein-PII, whereas its two products are diphosphate and uridylyl-[protein-PII].

This enzyme belongs to the family of transferases, specifically those transferring phosphorus-containing nucleotide groups (nucleotidyltransferases). The systematic name of this enzyme class is UTP:[protein-PII] uridylyltransferase. Other names in common use include PII uridylyl-transferase, and uridyl removing enzyme. This enzyme participates in two-component system - general.
