= SraL RNA =

The SraL RNA ('sra' for small RNA), also known as RyjA, is a small non-coding RNA discovered in E. coli, and later in Salmonella Tiphimurium. This ncRNA was found to be expressed only in stationary phase. It may possibly play a role in Salmonella virulence. The major stationary phase regulator RpoS is transcriptionally regulating SraL and directly binds to the sraL gene promoter. SraL down-regulates the expression of the ribosome-associated chaperone Trigger Factor (TF), which is involved in the folding of the newly synthesised cystolic proteins.
