= SRNA-Xcc1 =

Family of trans-acting non-coding RNA

sRNA-Xcc1 (small RNA identified from Xanthomonas campestris pv. campestris) is a family of trans-acting non-coding RNA (also known as small RNA). Homologs of sRNA-Xcc1 are found in a few bacterial strains belonging to alpha-proteobacteria, beta-proteobacteria, gamma-proteobacteria, and delta-proteobacteria. In Xanthomonas campestris pv. campestris, sRNA-Xcc1 is encoded by an integron gene cassette and is under the positive control of the virulence regulators HrpG and HrpX.

== Origin and phylogenetic distribution ==
sRNA-Xcc1 is encoded by a gene cassette in the integron of Xanthomonas campestris pv. campestris and homologs of sRNA-Xcc1 are frequently found in integron gene cassettes cloned from uncultured bacterium, it is possible that sRNA-Xcc1 is originally captured by integrons from natural environments. sRNA-Xcc1 homologs are found in a few taxonomically far related strains across alpha-, beta- and gamma-proteobacteria but not in close related bacteria, implying that sRNA-Xcc1 is transferred via horizontal gene transfer (HGT). sRNA-Xcc1 homologous gene are found located on Tn5542, a transposon carried by the plasmid pHMT112, indicating that the horizontal transfer of sRNA-Xcc1 is realized by means of transposons and/or plasmids.

== Potential biological function ==
The expression of sRNA-Xcc1 is under the positive control of the two important virulence regulators HrpG and HrpX of Xanthomonas campestris pv. campestris, indicating that sRNA-Xcc1 may be involved in the pathogenesis of the pathogen.

== Phylogenetic diagrams ==
Multiple alignment and the consensus secondary structure model of the sRNA-Xcc1 homologs. Multiple alignment was done by using ClustalW program and the consensus secondary structure was predicted based on the multiple alignment using RNAalifold program. The conserved sequence motif ‘AUACAAnACCC’ was boxed.

The phylogenetic tree of sRNA-Xcc1 homologs based on multiple alignments. Symbols on the right hand side of the name of bacterial strain indicate the class of the species that holds the sRNA-Xcc1 homolog, and the place where the homolog located.
