= Αr15 RNA =

αr15 is a family of bacterial small non-coding RNAs with representatives in a broad group of α-proteobacteria from the order Rhizobiales. The first members of this family (smr15C1 and smrC15C2) were found tandemly arranged in the same intergenic region (IGR) of the Sinorhizobium meliloti 1021 chromosome (C). Further homology and structure conservation analysis have identified full-length Smr15C1 and Smr15C2 homologs in several nitrogen-fixing symbiotic rhizobia (i.e. R. leguminosarum bv. viciae, R. leguminosarum bv. trifolii, R. etli, and several Mesorhizobium species), in the plant pathogens belonging to Agrobacterium species (i.e. A. tumefaciens, A. vitis, A. radiobacter, and Agrobacterium H13) as well as in a broad spectrum of Brucella species (B. ovis, B. canis, B. abortus and B. microtis, and several biovars of B. melitensis). The Smr15C1 (115 nt) and Smr15C2 (121 nt) homologs are also encoded in tandem within the same IGR region of Rhizobium and Agrobacterium species, whereas in Brucella species the αr15C loci are spread in the IGRs of Chromosome I. Moreover, this analysis also identified a third αr15 loci in extrachromosomal replicons of the mentioned nitrogen-fixing α-proteobacteria and in the Chromosome II of Brucella species. αr15 RNA species are 99-121 nt long (Table 1) and share a well defined common secondary structure consisting of three stem loops (Figure 1). The transcripts of the αr15 family can be catalogued as trans-acting sRNAs encoded by independent transcription units with recognizable promoter and transcription termination signatures within intergenic regions (IGRs) of the α-proteobacterial genomes (Figure 5).

== Discovery and structure ==
Smr15C1 y Smr15C2 sRNAs were described by del Val et al., as a result of a computational comparative genomic approach in the intergenic regions (IGRs) of the reference S. meliloti 1021 strain (http://iant.toulouse.inra.fr/bacteria/annotation/cgi/rhime.cgi). Although the primary nucleotide sequence of Smr15C1 y Smr15C2 showed high similarity (84% identity), specific probes for each sRNA could be designed which detected transcripts of different size and expression profiles.

TAP-based 5'-RACE experiments mapped the Smr15C1 and Smr15C2 transcription start sites (TSS) in the S. meliloti 1021 genome (http://iant.toulouse.inra.fr/bacteria/annotation/cgi/rhime.cgi). The Smr15C1 TSS was mapped to the chromosomal position 1698731 nt and the TSS of Smr15C2 to the nt 1698937. The 3'-ends were assumed to be located at the 1698617 nt and 1698817 nt respectively, matching the last residue of the consecutive Us stretch of a bona fide Rho-independent terminator (Figure 5). Parallel and later studies, in which Smr15C1 and Smr15C2 transcripts are referred to as two copies of sra41 or Sm3/Sm3', independently confirmed the expression of these sRNAs in S. melilloti and in its closely related strain 2011. Recent deep sequencing-based characterization of the small RNA fraction (50-350 nt) of S. meliloti 2011 also revealed the expression of Smr15C1 and Smr15C2, here referred to as SmelC411 and SmelC412 respectively, mapping the 5'- and 3'-ends of the full-length transcripts to essentially the same positions as del Val et al. in the S. meliloti 1021 chromosome. However, this study identified an additional TSS for Smr15C2 at position 1698948.

The nucleotide sequences of Smr15C1 and Smr15C2 were initially used as query to search against the Rfam database (version 10.0; http://rfam.xfam.org). This search revealed partial homology of both transcripts, restricted to the second hairpin and the Rho-independent terminator, to the RF00519 family of RNAs known as suhB (http://rfam.xfam.org/family/RF00519). However, no structural homologs of the full-length sRNAs were found in this database.

Both S.melilloti αr15 sRNAs were also BLASTed with default parameters against all the currently available bacterial genomes (1,615 sequences at 20 April 2011; https://www.ncbi.nlm.nih.gov). The regions exhibiting significant homology to the query sequence (78-89% similarity) were extracted to create a Covariance Model (CM) from a seed alignment using Infernal (version1.0) (Figure 2). This CM was used in a further search for new members of the αr15 family in the existing bacterial genomic databases.

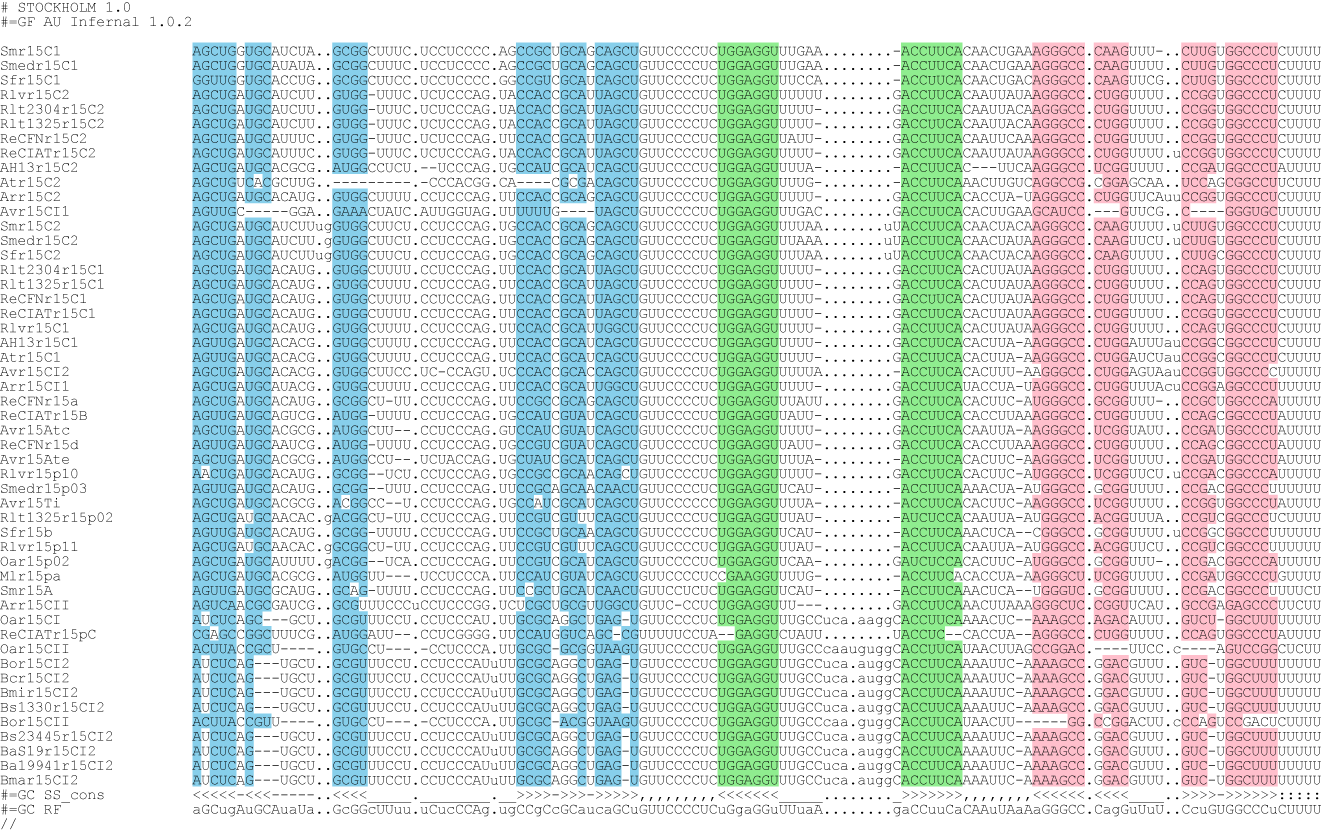
Figure 2: Covariance Model in stockholm format showing the consensus structure for the αr15 family. Each of the stems represented by the structure line #=GC SS_cons is in a different color, corresponding the red one to the rho independent terminator stem. Covariance Model in stockholm format can be downloaded here.

Table 1: Smr15C1 and Smr15C2 homologs in other symbionts and pathogens
CM model	Name	GI accession number	begin	end	strand	%GC	length	Organism
αr15	Smr15C1	gi|15963753|ref|NC_003047.1|	1698617	1698731	-	54	115	Sinorhizobium meliloti 1021
αr15	Smr15C2	gi|15963753|ref|NC_003047.1|	1698817	1698937	-	50	121	Sinorhizobium meliloti 1021
αr15	Smr15A	gi|16262453|ref|NC_003037.1|	552873	552984	+	51	112	Sinorhizobium meliloti 1021 plasmid pSymA
αr15	Smedr15C1	gi|150395228|ref|NC_009636.1|	1337011	1337126	-	53	116	Sinorhizobium medicae WSM419 chromosome
αr15	Smedr15C2	gi|150395228|ref|NC_009636.1|	1337212	1337331	-	50	120	Sinorhizobium medicae WSM419 chromosome
αr15	Smedr15p03	gi|150378263|ref|NC_009622.1|	40054	40165	-	52	112	Sinorhizobium medicae WSM419 plasmid pSMED03
αr15	Sfr15C1	gi|227820587|ref|NC_012587.1|	1612511	1612626	-	59	116	Sinorhizobium fredii NGR234 chromosome
αr15	Sfr15C2	gi|227820587|ref|NC_012587.1|	1612711	1612830	-	51	120	Sinorhizobium fredii NGR234 chromosome
αr15	Sfr15b	gi|227818258|ref|NC_012586.1|	134078	134190	-	55	113	Sinorhizobium fredii NGR234 plasmid pNGR234b
αr15	Atr15C1	gi|159184118|ref|NC_003062.2|	2163254	2163370	+	53	117	Agrobacterium tumefaciens str. C58 chromosome circular
αr15	Atr15C2	gi|159184118|ref|NC_003062.2|	2163454	2163554	+	57	101	Agrobacterium tumefaciens str. C58 chromosome circular
αr15	AH13r15C1	gi|325291453|ref|NC_015183.1|	2112823	2112939	+	52	117	Agrobacterium sp. H13-3 chromosome
αr15	AH13r15C2	gi|325291453|ref|NC_015183.1|	2113023	2113121	+	54	99	Agrobacterium sp. H13-3 chromosome
αr15	AH13r15a	gi|325168279|ref|NC_015184.1|	211698	211807	-	53	110	Agrobacterium sp. H13-3 plasmid pAspH13-3a
αr15	ReCIATr15C1	gi|190889639|ref|NC_010994.1|	3155217	3155332	+	51	116	Rhizobium etli CIAT 652
αr15	ReCIATr15C2	gi|190889639|ref|NC_010994.1|	3155440	3155555	+	48	116	Rhizobium etli CIAT 652
αr15	ReCIATr15pC	gi|190894340|ref|NC_010997.1|	941345	941452	+	53	108	Rhizobium etli CIAT 652 plasmid pC
αr15	ReCIATr15B	gi|190893983|ref|NC_010996.1|	187927	188041	-	50	115	Rhizobium etli CIAT 652 plasmid pB
αr15	Arr15CI1	gi|222084201|ref|NC_011985.1|	2506215	2506331	+	52	117	Agrobacterium radiobacter K84 chromosome 1
αr15	Arr15CI2	gi|222084201|ref|NC_011985.1|	2506418	2506534	+	54	117	Agrobacterium radiobacter K84 chromosome 1
αr15	Arr15CII	gi|222080781|ref|NC_011983.1|	1011511	1011624	-	57	114	Agrobacterium radiobacter K84 chromosome 2
αr15	Rlt2304r15C1	gi|209547612|ref|NC_011369.1|	2770612	2770727	+	50	116	Rhizobium leguminosarum bv. trifolii WSM2304 chromosome
αr15	Rlt2304r15C2	gi|209547612|ref|NC_011369.1|	2770835	2770949	+	50	115	Rhizobium leguminosarum bv. trifolii WSM2304 chromosome
αr15	Avr15CI1	gi|222147015|ref|NC_011989.1|	2608532	2608647	+	54	116	Agrobacterium vitis S4 chromosome 1
αr15	Avr15CI2	gi|222147015|ref|NC_011989.1|	2608739	2608839	+	46	101	Agrobacterium vitis S4 chromosome 1
αr15	Avr15Atc	gi|222083145|ref|NC_011984.1|	122624	122736	-	50	113	Agrobacterium vitis S4 plasmid pAtS4c
αr15	Avr15Ate	gi|222102412|ref|NC_011981.1|	198928	199039	+	51	112	Agrobacterium vitis S4 plasmid pAtS4e
αr15	Avr15Ti	gi|222080117|ref|NC_011982.1|	52286	52397	-	57	112	Agrobacterium vitis S4 plasmid pTiS4
αr15	Rlvr15C1	gi|116249766|ref|NC_008380.1|	3605490	3605605	+	51	116	Rhizobium leguminosarum bv. viciae 3841
αr15	Rlvr15C2	gi|116249766|ref|NC_008380.1|	3605714	3605829	+	48	116	Rhizobium leguminosarum bv. viciae 3841
αr15	Rlvr15p10	gi|116254467|ref|NC_008381.1|	138799	138912	+	56	114	Rhizobium leguminosarum bv. viciae 3841 plasmid pRL10
αr15	Rlvr15p11	gi|116255200|ref|NC_008384.1|	567053	567166	-	53	114	Rhizobium leguminosarum bv. viciae 3841 plasmid pRL11
αr15	Rlt1325r15C1	gi|241202755|ref|NC_012850.1|	2981275	2981390	+	50	116	Rhizobium leguminosarum bv. trifolii WSM1325
αr15	Rlt1325r15C2	gi|241202755|ref|NC_012850.1|	2981499	2981613	+	50	115	Rhizobium leguminosarum bv. trifolii WSM1325
αr15	Rlt1325r15p02	gi|241666492|ref|NC_012858.1|	36176	36289	+	51	114	Rhizobium leguminosarum bv. trifolii WSM1325 plasmid pR132502
αr15	ReCFNr15C1	gi|86355669|ref|NC_007761.1|	3117667	3117782	+	50	116	Rhizobium etli CFN 42
αr15	ReCFNr15C2	gi|86355669|ref|NC_007761.1|	3117890	3118004	+	50	115	Rhizobium etli CFN 42
αr15	ReCFNr15d	gi|89255298|ref|NC_004041.2|	172760	172874	-	50	115	Rhizobium etli CFN 42 symbiotic plasmid p42d
αr15	ReCFNr15a	gi|86359705|ref|NC_007762.1|	157296	157409	+	56	114	Rhizobium etli CFN 42 plasmid p42a
αr15	Mlr15a	gi|13488050|ref|NC_002679.1|	65044	65154	-	51	111	Mesorhizobium loti MAFF303099 plasmid pMLa
αr15	Bcr15CII	gi|161620094|ref|NC_010104.1|	707465	707572	+	56	108	Brucella canis ATCC 23365 chromosome II
αr15	Bcr15CI1	gi|161617991|ref|NC_010103.1|	1379297	1379398	-	51	102	Brucella canis ATCC 23365 chromosome I
αr15	Bcr15CI2	gi|161617991|ref|NC_010103.1|	1451969	1452087	-	50	119	Brucella canis ATCC 23365 chromosome I
αr15	Bs23445r15CI1	gi|163842277|ref|NC_010169.1|	1401085	1401186	-	51	102	Brucella suis ATCC 23445 chromosome I
αr15	Bs23445r15CI2	gi|163842277|ref|NC_010169.1|	1473791	1473909	-	50	119	Brucella suis ATCC 23445 chromosome I
αr15	Bs23445r15CII	gi|163844199|ref|NC_010167.1|	696081	696188	+	56	108	Brucella suis ATCC 23445 chromosome II
αr15	Bm16Mr15CI	gi|17986284|ref|NC_003317.1|	607684	607785	+	51	102	Brucella melitensis bv. 1 str. 16M chromosome I
αr15	Bm16Mr15CII	gi|17988344|ref|NC_003318.1|	589501	589608	-	56	108	Brucella melitensis bv. 1 str. 16M chromosome II
αr15	BaS19r15CII	gi|189022234|ref|NC_010740.1|	508055	508162	-	56	108	Brucella abortus S19 chromosome 2
αr15	BaS19r15CI1	gi|189023268|ref|NC_010742.1|	1396794	1396895	-	51	102	Brucella abortus S19 chromosome 1
αr15	BaS19r15CI2	gi|189023268|ref|NC_010742.1|	1469407	1469525	-	50	119	Brucella abortus S19 chromosome 1
αr15	Bm23457r15CII	gi|225685871|ref|NC_012442.1|	687290	687397	+	56	108	Brucella melitensis ATCC 23457 chromosome II
αr15	Bm23457r15CI	gi|225851546|ref|NC_012441.1|	1400641	1400742	-	51	102	Brucella melitensis ATCC 23457 chromosome I
αr15	Bs1330r15CII	gi|56968493|ref|NC_004311.2|	708185	708292	+	56	108	Brucella suis 1330 chromosome II
αr15	Bs1330r15CI1	gi|56968325|ref|NC_004310.3|	1380381	1380482	-	51	102	Brucella suis 1330 chromosome I
αr15	Bs1330r15CI2	gi|56968325|ref|NC_004310.3|	1453011	1453129	-	50	119	Brucella suis 1330 chromosome I
αr15	Ba19941r15CI1	gi|62288991|ref|NC_006932.1|	1398464	1398565	-	51	102	Brucella abortus bv. 1 str. 9-941 chromosome I
αr15	Ba19941r15CI2	gi|62288991|ref|NC_006932.1|	1471073	1471191	-	50	119	Brucella abortus bv. 1 str. 9-941 chromosome I
αr15	Ba19941r15CII	gi|62316961|ref|NC_006933.1|	508851	508958	-	56	108	Brucella abortus bv. 1 str. 9-941 chromosome II
αr15	Bmar15CII	gi|83268957|ref|NC_007624.1|	508839	508946	-	56	108	Brucella melitensis biovar Abortus 2308 chromosome II
αr15	Bmar15CI1	gi|82698932|ref|NC_007618.1|	1395614	1395715	-	51	102	Brucella melitensis biovar Abortus 2308 chromosome I
αr15	Bmar15CI2	gi|82698932|ref|NC_007618.1|	1468227	1468345	-	50	119	Brucella melitensis biovar Abortus 2308 chromosome I
αr15	Bor15CI1	gi|148558820|ref|NC_009505.1|	1387928	1388029	-	50	102	Brucella ovis ATCC 25840 chromosome I
αr15	Bor15CI2	gi|148558820|ref|NC_009505.1|	1460506	1460624	-	50	119	Brucella ovis ATCC 25840 chromosome I
αr15	Bor15CII	gi|148557829|ref|NC_009504.1|	709415	709524	+	54	110	Brucella ovis ATCC 25840 chromosome II
αr15	Bmir15CII	gi|256014795|ref|NC_013118.1|	709102	709209	+	56	108	Brucella microti CCM 4915 chromosome 2
αr15	Bmir15CI1	gi|256368465|ref|NC_013119.1|	1387776	1387877	-	51	102	Brucella microti CCM 4915 chromosome 1
αr15	Bmir15CI2	gi|256368465|ref|NC_013119.1|	1461298	1461416	-	50	119	Brucella microti CCM 4915 chromosome 1
αr15	Oar15CI	gi|153007346|ref|NC_009667.1|	1751482	1751598	+	49	117	Brucella anthropi ATCC 49188 chromosome 1
αr15	Oar15CII	gi|153010078|ref|NC_009668.1|	1270083	1270191	+	56	109	Brucella anthropi ATCC 49188 chromosome 2
αr15	Oar15p02	gi|153011934|ref|NC_009670.1|	22208	22320	+	54	113	Brucella anthropi ATCC 49188 plasmid pOANT02

The results were manually inspected to deduce a consensus secondary structure for the family (Figure 1 and Figure 2). The consensus structure was also independently predicted with the program locARNATE comparing the obtained predictions. The manual inspection of the sequences found with the CM using Infernal allowed finding 38 true homologues in phylogenetically related α-proteobacterial genomes. The 26 closest αr15 family members were found as tandem in the same chromosomal IGRs for the following species besides S. melilloti:

- Sinorhizobium species: S. medicae and S. fredii
- Rhizobium species: two R. leguminosarum trifolii strains (WSM304 and WSM35), two R. etli strains CFN 42 and CIAT 652, the reference R. leguminosarum bv. viciae 3841 strain
- Agrobacterium species: A. vitis,A. tumefaciens, A. radiobacter and A. H13

All these sequences showed significant bit scores and Infernal E-values (1.71e-28 - 2.03e-20). However, the plasmidic copies of all mentioned α-proteobacterial genomes and those αr15 members encoded by Brucella species (B. ovis, B. canis, B. abortus, B. microtis, and several biovars of B. melitensis), Brucella anthropi and Mesorhizobium lotishowed high E-values between (1e-19 and 8e-03) but very low bit-scores.

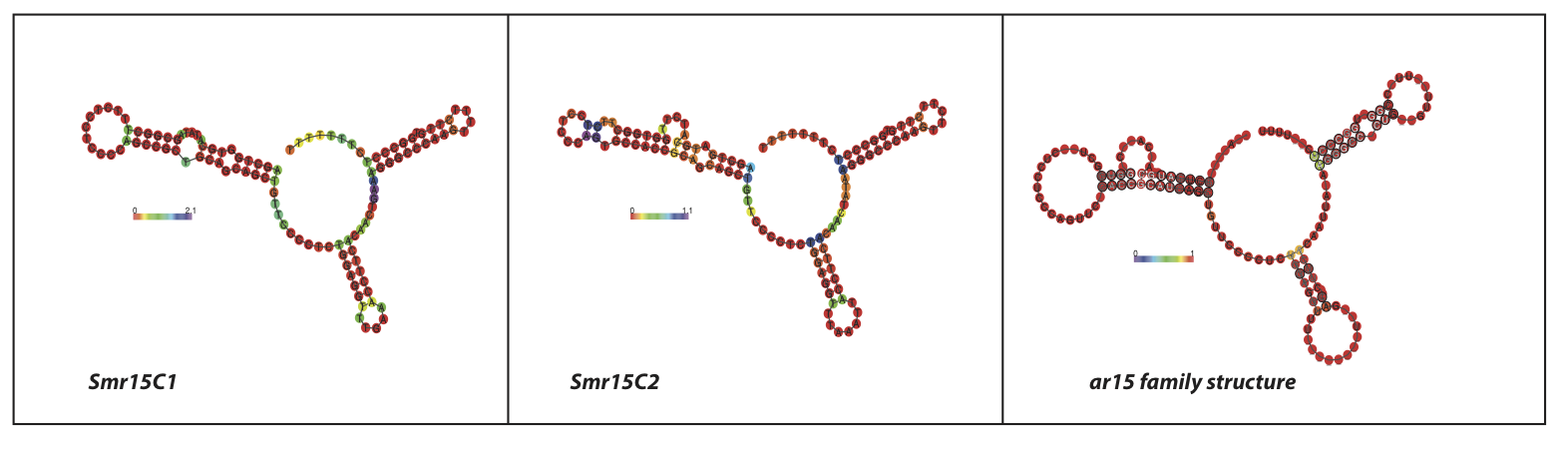
Figure 1: Consensus secondary structure of Smr15C1, Smr15C2 and the αr15 family predicted by RNA and RNAalifold. Smr15C1 and Smr15C2 are colored with a base probability scheme. The coloring of the αr15 family structure follows a base pairs conservation scheme: Red: base pair occurring in all sequences used to generate the consensus; yellow: two types of base pairing occur; Green: three types of base pairing occur. The shading of base pairs represents: Saturated, no inconsistent sequences; Pale, one inconsistent sequence; Very pale, two inconsistent sequences.

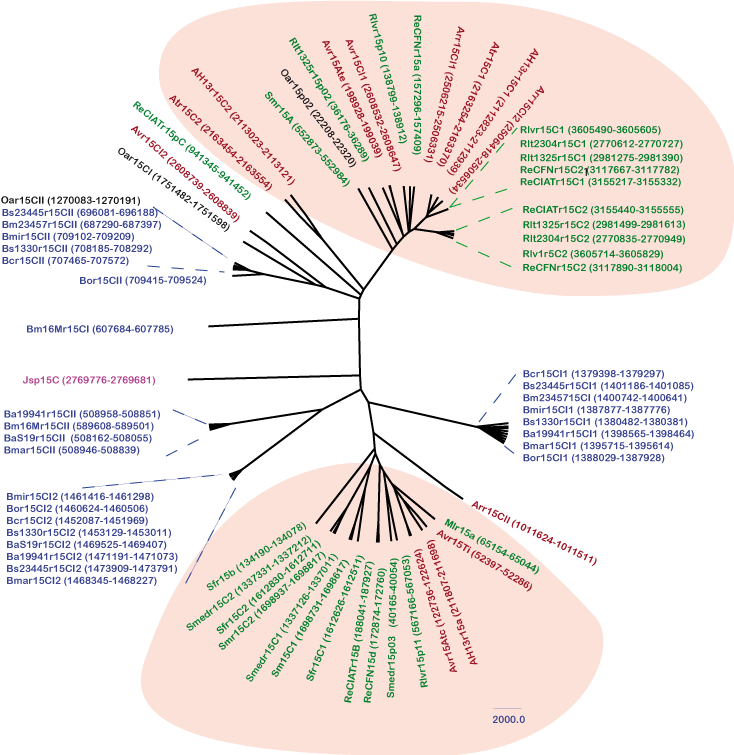
Figure 3: Phylogenetic distribution of known and predicted αr9 genes. Gene numbers are based on computational analysis using the program Infernal. Legend: Smr15C1 = Sinorhizobium meliloti 1021 (NC_003047), Smr15C2 = Sinorhizobium meliloti 1021 (NC_003047), Smr15A = Sinorhizobium meliloti 1021 plasmid pSymA (NC_003037), Smedr15C1 = Sinorhizobium medicae WSM419 chromosome (NC_009636), Smedr15C2 = Sinorhizobium medicae WSM419chromosome (NC_009636), Smedr15p03 = Sinorhizobium medicae WSM419 plasmid pSMED03 (NC_009622), Sfr15C1 = Sinorhizobium fredii NGR234 chromosome (NC_012587), Sfr15C2 = Sinorhizobium fredii NGR234 chromosome (NC_012587), Sfr15b = Sinorhizobium fredii NGR234 plasmid pNGR234b (NC_012586), Atr15C2 = Agrobacterium tumefaciens str. C58 chromosome circular (NC_003062), Atr15C1 = Agrobacterium tumefaciens str. C58 chromosome circular (NC_003062), AH13r15C2 = Agrobacterium sp. H13-3 chromosome (NC_015183), AH13r15C1 = Agrobacterium sp. H13-3 chromosome (NC_015183), AH13r15a = Agrobacterium sp. H13-3 plasmid pAspH13-3a (NC_015184), ReCIATr15C2 = Rhizobium etli CIAT 652 (NC_010994), ReCIATr15C1 = Rhizobium etli CIAT 652 (NC_010994), ReCIATr15pC = Rhizobium etli CIAT 652 plasmid pC (NC_010997), ReCIATr15B = Rhizobium etli CIAT 652 plasmid pB (NC_010996), Arr15CI2 = Agrobacterium radiobacter K84 chromosome 1 (NC_011985), Arr15CI1 = Agrobacterium radiobacter K84 chromosome 1 (NC_011985), Arr15CII = Agrobacterium radiobacter K84 chromosome 2 (NC_011983), Rlt2304r15C2 = Rhizobium leguminosarum bv. trifolii WSM2304 chromosome (NC_011369), Rlt2304r15C1 = Rhizobium leguminosarum bv. trifolii WSM2304 chromosome (NC_011369), Avr15C2 = Agrobacterium vitis S4 chromosome 1 (NC_011989), Avr15C1 = Agrobacterium vitis S4 chromosome 2 (NC_011989), Avr15pAtc = Agrobacterium vitis S4 plasmid pAtS4c (NC_011984), Avr15Ate = Agrobacterium vitis S4 plasmid pAtS4e (NC_011981), Avr15Ti = Agrobacterium vitis S4 plasmid pTiS4 (NC_011982), Rlvr15C2 = Rhizobium leguminosarum bv. viciae 3841 (NC_008380), Rlvr15C1 = Rhizobium leguminosarum bv. viciae 3841 (NC_008380), Rlvr15p10 = Rhizobium leguminosarum bv. viciae 3841 plasmid pRL10 (NC_008381), Rlvr15p11 = Rhizobium leguminosarum bv. viciae 3841 plasmid pRL11 (NC_008384), Rlt1325r15C2 = Rhizobium leguminosarum bv. trifolii WSM1325 (NC_012850), Rlt1325r15C1 = Rhizobium leguminosarum bv. trifolii WSM1325 (NC_012850), Rlt1325r15p02 = Rhizobium leguminosarum bv. trifolii WSM1325 plasmid pR132502 (NC_012858), ReCFNr15C2 = Rhizobium etli CFN 42 (NC_007761), ReCFNr15C1 = Rhizobium etli CFN 42 (NC_007761), ReCFNr15d = Rhizobium etli CFN 42 symbiotic plasmid p42d (NC_004041), ReCFNr15a = Rhizobium etli CFN 42 plasmid p42a (NC_007762), Mlr15a = Mesorhizobium loti MAFF303099 plasmid pMLa (NC_002679), Bcr15CII = Brucella canis ATCC 23365 chromosome II (NC_010104), Bcr15CI2 = Brucella canis ATCC 23365 chromosome I (NC_010103), Bcr15CI1 = Brucella canis ATCC 23365 chromosome I (NC_010103), Bs23445r15CI2 = Brucella suis ATCC 23445 chromosome I (NC_010169), Bs23445r15CI1 = Brucella suis ATCC 23445 chromosome I (NC_010169), Bs23445r15CII = Brucella suis ATCC 23445 chromosome II (NC_010167), Bm16MCI = Brucella melitensis bv. 1 str. 16M chromosome I (NC_003317), Bm16Mr15CII = Brucella melitensis bv. 1 str. 16M chromosome II (NC_003318), BaS19r15CII = Brucella abortus S19 chromosome 2 (NC_010740), BaS19r15CI2 = Brucella abortus S19 chromosome 1 (NC_010742), BaS19r15CI1 = Brucella abortus S19 chromosome 1 (NC_010742), Bm23457r15CII = Brucella melitensis ATCC 23457 chromosome II (NC_012442), Bm23457r15CI = Brucella melitensis ATCC 23457 chromosome I (NC_012441), Bs1330r15CII = Brucella suis 1330 chromosome II (NC_004311), Bs1330r15CI2 = Brucella suis 1330 chromosome I (NC_004310), Bs1330r15CI1 = Brucella suis 1330 chromosomeI (NC_004310), Ba19941r15CI2 = Brucella abortus bv. 1 str. 9-941 chromosome I (NC_006932), Ba19941r15CI1 = Brucella abortus bv. 1 str. 9-941 chromosome I (NC_006932), Ba19941r15CII = Brucella abortus bv. 1 str. 9-941 chromosome II (NC_006933), Bmar15CII = Brucella melitensis biovar Abortus 2308 chromosome II (NC_007624), Bmar15CI2 = Brucella melitensis biovar Abortus 2308 chromosome I (NC_007618), Bmar15CI1 = Brucella melitensis biovar Abortus 2308 chromosome I (NC_007618), Bor15CI2 = Brucella ovis ATCC 25840 chromosome I (NC_009505), Bor15CI1 = Brucella ovis ATCC 25840 chromosome I (NC_009505), Bor15CII = Brucella ovis ATCC 25840 chromosome II (NC_009504), Bmir15CII = Brucella microti CCM 4915 chromosome 2 (NC_013118), Bmr15CI2 = Brucella microti CCM 4915 chromosome 1 (NC_013119), Bmir15CI1 = Brucella microti CCM 4915 chromosome 1 (NC_013119), Oar15CI = Brucella anthropi ATCC 49188 chromosome 1 (NC_009667), Oar15CII = Brucella anthropi ATCC 49188 chromosome 2 (NC_009668).

== Expression and functional information ==
Several studies have assessed Smr15C1 and Smr15C2 expression in S. meliloti 1021 under different biological conditions; i.e. bacterial growth in TY, minimal medium (MM) and luteolin-MM broth and endosymbiotic bacteria (i.e. mature symbiotic alfalfa nodules), high salt stress, oxidative stress and cold and hot shock stresses. The results showed different expression profiles for both sRNAs, which is consistent with their organization in independent and differentially regulated transcription units within the same IGR (Figure 4 and Figure 5).

The expression of Smr15C1 and Smr15C2 in free-living bacteria was found to be growth-dependent but in an opposite manner. While Smr15C1 is accumulated in the stationary phase Smr15C2 is The expression of Smr15C1 and Smr15C2 in free-living bacteria was found to be growth-dependent but in an opposite manner. While Smr15C1 is accumulated in the stationary phase, Smr15C2 is preferentially expressed in log bacterial cultures. Additionally, Schlüter et al. recently described the up-regulation of Smr15C2 under cold shock stress, while no effects of a temperature downshift were observed in the expression of Smr15C1. The growth-dependent opposite expression profiles of Smr15C1 and Smr15C2, have not been observed in their Agrobacterium tumefaciens counterparts referred to as AbcR1 and AbcR2, respectively, by Wilms et al. (Atr15C1 and Atr15C2 in this work). AbcR1 and AbcR2 are induced simultaneously and both accumulate in stationary phase. This behavior agrees with the fact that AbcR1 and AbcR2 have identical promoter-like sequences, being these very similar to the one of Smr15C2, but not to the promoter sequence of Smr15C1 (see Promoter Analysis). Furthermore, a first approach to the function of the AbcR genes revealed that these sRNAs silence the GABA uptake system through the down-regulation of the corresponding ABC transporter genes in an Hfq-dependent manner. GABA is one of the plants signals recognized by rhizobacteria in some plant-bacteria interactions. Thus, these results, point to the shutting off synthesis of the GABA uptake system as a way used by A. tumefaciens to subvert the plant defense mechanism.

Recent co-immunoprecipitation experiment showed that both, Smr15C1 and Smr15C2, do bind the S. meliloti RNA chaperone Hfq, supporting also a role for these transcripts in this bacterium as trans-acting antisense riboregulators.They were also shown to fine-tune nutrient uptake.

== Promoter analysis ==
All αr15 loci have recognizable σ^{70}-dependent promoters showing a -35/-10 consensus motif CTTGAC-n17-CTATAT, which has been previously shown to be widely conserved among several other genera in the α-subgroup of proteobacteria. A multiple sequence alignment of these promoter regions revealed a conserved sequence stretch extending up to 80 bp upstream of the transcription start site in all the αr15 loci with the only exceptions of the S. meliloti, S.fredii and S. medicae αr15C1 promoters.

To identify binding sites for other known transcription factors we used the fasta sequences provided by RegPredict(http://regpredict.lbl.gov/regpredict/help.html), and used those position weight matrices (PSWM) provided by RegulonDB (http://regulondb.ccg.unam.mx). We built PSWM for each transcription factor from the RegPredict sequences using the Consensus/Patser program, choosing the best final matrix for motif lengths between 14 and 30 bps a threshold average E-value < 10E-10 for each matrix was established, (see "Thresholded consensus" in http://gps-tools2.its.yale.edu). Moreover, we searched for conserved unknown motifs using MEME (http://meme.sdsc.edu/meme4_6_1/intro.html) and used relaxed regular expressions (i.e. pattern matching) over all αr15 homologs promoters.

These studies revealed a difference in regulation between S. melilloti, S.fredii and S. medicae αr15C1 sRNAs and the rest of the αr15 family members independently of their group of origin (Rhizobium or Agrobacterium ) and genomic location (αr15C1, αr15C2, αr15plasmid) (Figure 4).

The rest of the family members presented a very well conserved 30 bp long region between positions -36 and -75. This conserved region, was used to query databases of known transcription factor motifs with TomTom, the best matching motif was SMb20667_Rhizobiales, motif belonging to RegTransBase (http://regtransbase.lbl.gov/cgi-bin/regtransbase?page=main). The Smb20667 correspond to the binding site for a dicarboxylate metabolism regulator in Rhizobiales that belongs to the LacI family. This motif was identified clustering genes of tartrate dehydrogenase, succinate semialdehyde dehydrogenase, 3-hydroxyisobutyrate dehydrogenase and hydroxypyruvate isomerase in S. meliloti, and several Rhizobiums and it is marked in the promoter alignment figure (Figure 5) with an orange box. Moreover, another conserved sequence was found using MEME in the promoter region of the Sinorhizobium species αr15C1. This conserved region was used to query databases of known transcription factor motifs with TomTom, and the best matching motif was SMb20537_Rhizobiales (Figure 5 in red), that identifies the binding site for a sugar utilization regulator in Rhizobiales from the LacI family as well.

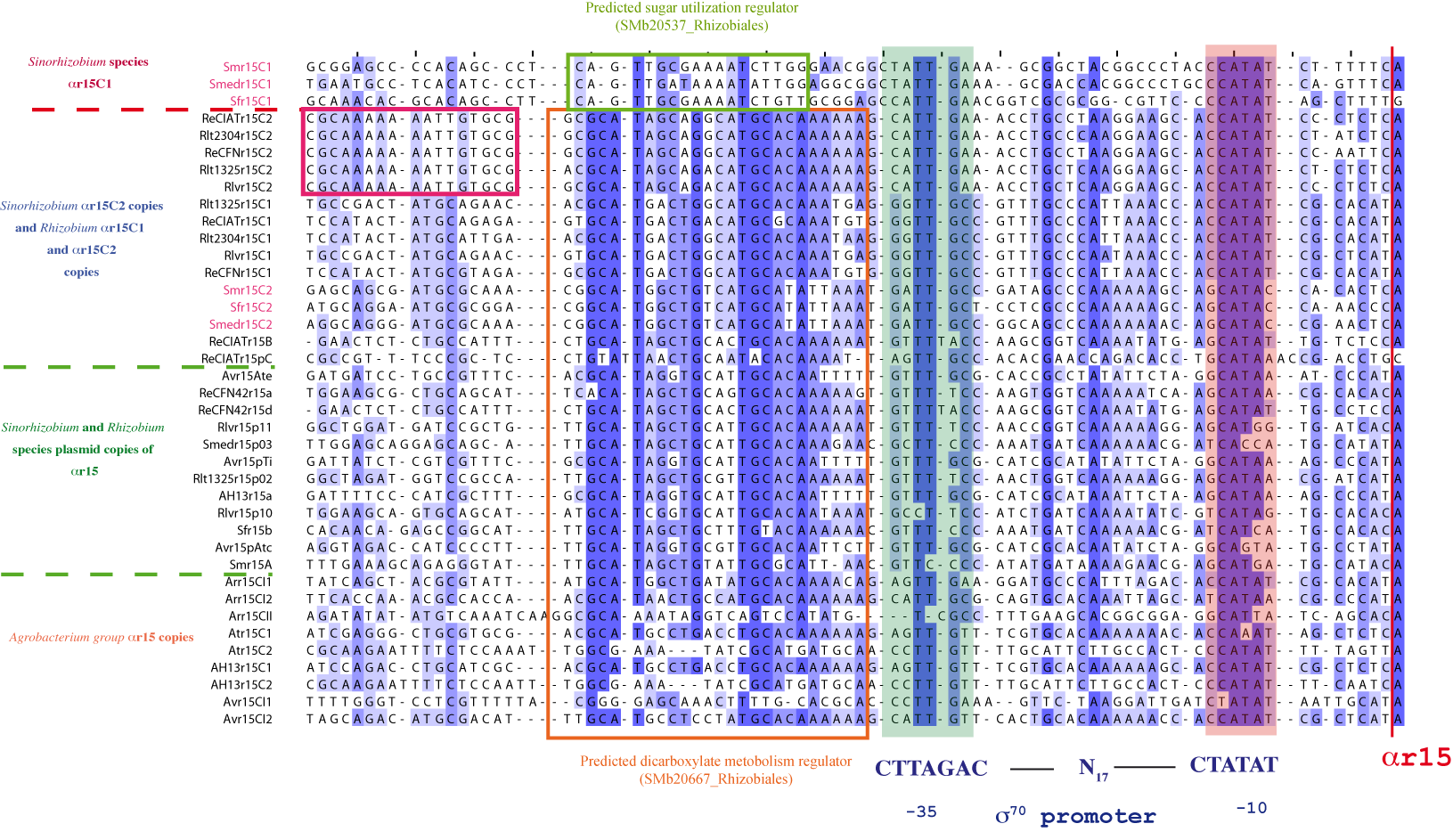
Figure 5: Graphic representation of the 15C seed members' promoter region. All members presented putative σ70 promoters with -30 and -10 boxes marked in green and red respectively. Conserved motifs are marked with orange and red color boxes.

== Genomic context ==
Most of the αr15 family members are trans-encoded sRNAs transcribed from independent promoters in chromosomal IGRs. Many of the αr15 members neighboring genes were not annotated, and thus they were further manually curated. As a result, we could classify the members of the family in four subgroups according to their genomic context. In the first group are the tandem αr15C1 and αr15C2 loci of the Rhizobium, Sinorhizobium and Agrobacterium species. They exhibited a great degree of conservation in the up and downstream genes, which have been predicted to code for a LysR transcriptional regulator and an AsR transcriptional regulator protein respectively (Figure 5). The only exception in this group was found for S. fredii that presented a very different genomic context. The second group includes the αr15CI1 loci in the Brucella species (additional file 2), which presented a very well conserved genomic context (Aspartate amino transferase and LysR/unknown transcriptional regulator) with partial synteny to the first group. A very different genomic context, not even partially conserved in most cases, was present in all plasmid-borne αr15 loci (additional file 1), which integrates the defined group three, where the flanking genes corresponded to ABC transporter proteins, excisonase or transposase among others. The αr15CI2 loci in the Brucella species (additional file 3) conform the group four and presented an up and downstream conserved genomic context, coding all regions for UDP-3-O-hydroxymyristoyl N-acetylglucosamine deacetylase and GTPAse cell division protein FtsZ. To the last group correspond the αr15CII loci in the Brucella group (additional file 4) where only one of the genes could be annotated always as a glycine deshidrogenase, the other sRNA flanking position was mostly coped by a hypothetical protein conserved in the Brucella group to which no domain, motif or GO functional annotation could be assigned.

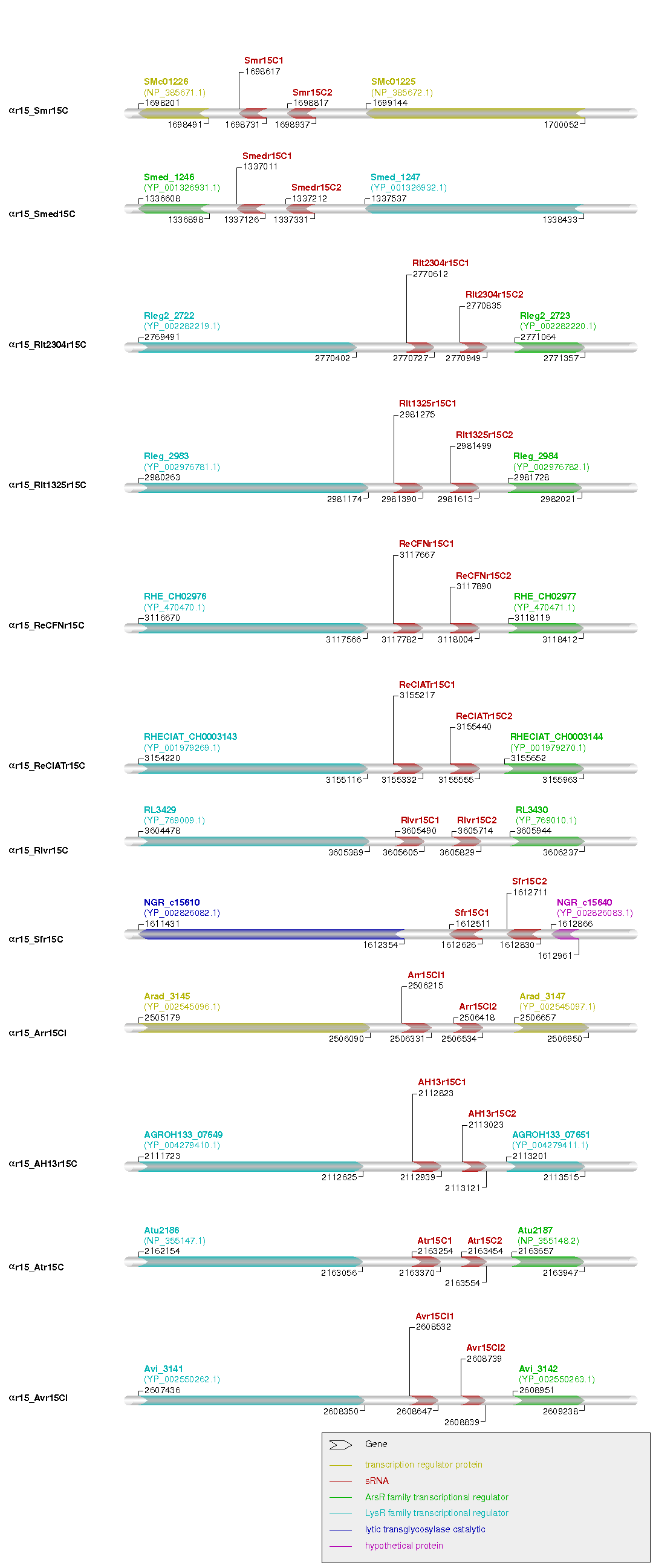
Figure 4: Genomic context scheme of Smr15 and its closest homologues in other organisms. The αr15 RNA genes are represented by red arrows and the flanking ORFs by arrows on different colors depending on their product function (legend). Numbers indicate the αr15 RNA gene's and flanking ORFs coordinates in each organism genome database. The gene strand is represented with the file direction. On the left of the figure identification names are used which correspond to a certain organism: Legend: αr15_Smr15C = Sinorhizobium meliloti 1021 (NC_003047), αr15_Smedr15C = Sinorhizobium medicae WSM419 chromosome (NC_009636), αr15_Sfr15C = Sinorhizobium fredii NGR234 chromosome (NC_012587), αr15_Atr15C = Agrobacterium tumefaciens str. C58 chromosome circular (NC_003062), αr15_AH13r15C = Agrobacterium sp. H13-3 chromosome (NC_015183), αr15_ReCIATr15C = Rhizobium etli CIAT 652 (NC_010994), αr15_Arr15CI = Agrobacterium radiobacter K84 chromosome 1 (NC_011985), αr15_Rlt2304r15C = Rhizobium leguminosarum bv. trifolii WSM2304 chromosome (NC_011369), αr15_Avr15C = Agrobacterium vitis S4 chromosome 1 (NC_011989), αr15_Rlvr15C = Rhizobium leguminosarum bv. viciae 3841 (NC_008380), αr15_Rlt1325r15C = Rhizobium leguminosarum bv. trifolii WSM1325 (NC_012850), αr15_ReCFNr15C = Rhizobium etli CFN 42 (NC_007761).

Additional Files:

- Genomic context graph of the αr15 family plasmid copies Image:Smbr15 1.png
- Genomic context graph of the αr15CI1 loci in the Brucella group Image:Smbr15 2.png
- Genomic context graph of the αr15CI2 loci in the Brucella group Image:Smbr15 3.png
- Genomic context graph of the αr15CII loci in the Brucella group Image:Smbr15 4.png

Table 2: Detailed Genomic context information of the αr15 sRNA seed members.
Family	Feature type	Feature name	Strand	Begin	End	Protein name	Annotation	Organism
αr15_Smr15C	gene	SMc01226	R	1698201	1698491	NP_385671.1	transcription regulator protein	Sinorhizobium meliloti 1021 (NC_003047)
αr15_Smr15C	sRNA	Smr15C1	R	1698617	1698731	-	sRNA	Sinorhizobium meliloti 1021 (NC_003047)
αr15_Smr15C	sRNA	Smr15C2	R	1698817	1698937	-	sRNA	Sinorhizobium meliloti 1021 (NC_003047)
αr15_Smr15C	gene	SMc01225	R	1699144	1700052	NP_385672.1	transcription regulator protein	Sinorhizobium meliloti 1021 (NC_003047)
αr15_Smed15C	gene	Smed_1246	R	1336608	1336898	YP_001326931.1	ArsR family transcriptional regulator	Sinorhizobium medicae WSM419 chromosome (NC_009636)
αr15_Smed15C	sRNA	Smedr15C1	R	1337011	1337126	-	sRNA	Sinorhizobium medicae WSM419 chromosome (NC_009636)
αr15_Smed15C	sRNA	Smedr15C2	R	1337212	1337331	-	sRNA	Sinorhizobium medicae WSM419 chromosome (NC_009636)
αr15_Smed15C	gene	Smed_1247	R	1337537	1338433	YP_001326932.1	LysR family transcriptional regulator	Sinorhizobium medicae WSM419 chromosome (NC_009636)
αr15_Rlt2304r15C	gene	Rleg2_2722	D	2769491	2770402	YP_002282219.1	LysR family transcriptional regulator	Rhizobium leguminosarum bv. trifolii WSM2304 chromosome (NC_011369)
αr15_Rlt2304r15C	sRNA	Rlt2304r15C1	D	2770612	2770727	-	sRNA	Rhizobium leguminosarum bv. trifolii WSM2304 chromosome (NC_011369)
αr15_Rlt2304r15C	sRNA	Rlt2304r15C2	D	2770835	2770949	-	sRNA	Rhizobium leguminosarum bv. trifolii WSM2304 chromosome (NC_011369)
αr15_Rlt2304r15C	gene	Rleg2_2723	D	2771064	2771357	YP_002282220.1	ArsR family transcriptional regulator	Rhizobium leguminosarum bv. trifolii WSM2304 chromosome (NC_011369)
αr15_Rlt1325r15C	gene	Rleg_2983	D	2980263	2981174	YP_002976781.1	LysR family transcriptional regulator	Rhizobium leguminosarum bv. trifolii WSM1325 (NC_012850)
αr15_Rlt1325r15C	sRNA	Rlt1325r15C1	D	2981275	2981390	-	sRNA	Rhizobium leguminosarum bv. trifolii WSM1325 (NC_012850)
αr15_Rlt1325r15C	sRNA	Rlt1325r15C2	D	2981499	2981613	-	sRNA	Rhizobium leguminosarum bv. trifolii WSM1325 (NC_012850)
αr15_Rlt1325r15C	gene	Rleg_2984	D	2981728	2982021	YP_002976782.1	ArsR family transcriptional regulator	Rhizobium leguminosarum bv. trifolii WSM1325 (NC_012850)
αr15_ReCFNr15C	gene	RHE_CH02976	D	3116670	3117566	YP_470470.1	LysR family transcriptional regulator	Rhizobium etli CFN 42 (NC_007761)
αr15_ReCFNr15C	sRNA	ReCFNr15C1	D	3117667	3117782	-	sRNA	Rhizobium etli CFN 42 (NC_007761)
αr15_ReCFNr15C	sRNA	ReCFNr15C2	D	3117890	3118004	-	sRNA	Rhizobium etli CFN 42 (NC_007761)
αr15_ReCFNr15C	gene	RHE_CH02977	D	3118119	3118412	YP_470471.1	ArsR family transcriptional regulator	Rhizobium etli CFN 42 (NC_007761)
αr15_ReCIATr15C	gene	RHECIAT_CH0003143	D	3154220	3155116	YP_001979269.1	LysR family transcriptional regulator	Rhizobium etli CIAT 652 (NC_010994)
αr15_ReCIATr15C	sRNA	ReCIATr15C1	D	3155217	3155332	-	sRNA	Rhizobium etli CIAT 652 (NC_010994)
αr15_ReCIATr15C	sRNA	ReCIATr15C2	D	3155440	3155555	-	sRNA	Rhizobium etli CIAT 652 (NC_010994)
αr15_ReCIATr15C	gene	RHECIAT_CH0003144	D	3155652	3155963	YP_001979270.1	ArsR family transcriptional regulator	Rhizobium etli CIAT 652 (NC_010994)
αr15_Rlvr15C	gene	RL3429	D	3604478	3605389	YP_769009.1	LysR family transcriptional regulator	Rhizobium leguminosarum bv. viciae 3841 (NC_008380)
αr15_Rlvr15C	sRNA	Rlvr15C1	D	3605490	3605605	-	sRNA	Rhizobium leguminosarum bv. viciae 3841 (NC_008380)
αr15_Rlvr15C	sRNA	Rlvr15C2	D	3605714	3605829	-	sRNA	Rhizobium leguminosarum bv. viciae 3841 (NC_008380)
αr15_Rlvr15C	gene	RL3430	D	3605944	3606237	YP_769010.1	ArsR family transcriptional regulator	Rhizobium leguminosarum bv. viciae 3841 (NC_008380)
αr15_Sfr15C	gene	NGR_c15610	R	1611431	1612354	YP_002826082.1	lytic transglycosylase catalytic	Sinorhizobium fredii NGR234 chromosome (NC_012587)
αr15_Sfr15C	sRNA	Sfr15C1	R	1612511	1612626	-	sRNA	Sinorhizobium fredii NGR234 chromosome (NC_012587)
αr15_Sfr15C	sRNA	Sfr15C2	R	1612711	1612830	-	sRNA	Sinorhizobium fredii NGR234 chromosome (NC_012587)
αr15_Sfr15C	gene	NGR_c15640	R	1612866	1612961	YP_002826083.1	hypothetical protein	Sinorhizobium fredii NGR234 chromosome (NC_012587)
αr15_Arr15CI	gene	Arad_3145	D	2505179	2506090	YP_002545096.1	transcription regulator protein	Agrobacterium radiobacter K84 chromosome 1 (NC_011985)
αr15_Arr15CI	sRNA	Arr15CI1	D	2506215	2506331	-	sRNA	Agrobacterium radiobacter K84 chromosome 1 (NC_011985)
αr15_Arr15CI	sRNA	Arr15CI2	D	2506418	2506534	-	sRNA	Agrobacterium radiobacter K84 chromosome 1 (NC_011985)
αr15_Arr15CI	gene	Arad_3147	D	2506657	2506950	YP_002545097.1	transcription regulator protein	Agrobacterium radiobacter K84 chromosome 1 (NC_011985)
αr15_AH13r15C	gene	AGROH133_07649	D	2111723	2112625	YP_004279410.1	LysR family transcriptional regulator	Agrobacterium sp. H13-3 chromosome (NC_015183)
αr15_AH13r15C	sRNA	AH13r15C1	D	2112823	2112939	-	sRNA	Agrobacterium sp. H13-3 chromosome (NC_015183)
αr15_AH13r15C	sRNA	AH13r15C2	D	2113023	2113121	-	sRNA	Agrobacterium sp. H13-3 chromosome (NC_015183)
αr15_AH13r15C	gene	AGROH133_07651	D	2113201	2113515	YP_004279411.1	LysR family transcriptional regulator	Agrobacterium sp. H13-3 chromosome (NC_015183)
αr15_Atr15C	gene	Atu2186	D	2162154	2163056	NP_355147.1	LysR family transcriptional regulator	Agrobacterium tumefaciens C58 chromosome circular (NC_003062)
αr15_Atr15C	sRNA	Atr15C1	D	2163254	2163370	-	sRNA	Agrobacterium tumefaciens C58 chromosome circular (NC_003062)
αr15_Atr15C	sRNA	Atr15C2	D	2163454	2163554	-	sRNA	Agrobacterium tumefaciens C58 chromosome circular (NC_003062)
αr15_Atr15C	gene	Atu2187	D	2163657	2163947	NP_355148.2	ArsR family transcriptional regulator	Agrobacterium tumefaciens C58 chromosome circular (NC_003062)
αr15_Avr15CI	gene	Avi_3141	D	2607436	2608350	YP_002550262.1	LysR family transcriptional regulator	Agrobacterium vitis S4 chromosome 1 (NC_011989)
αr15_Avr15CI	sRNA	Avr15CI1	D	2608532	2608647	-	sRNA	Agrobacterium vitis S4 chromosome 1 (NC_011989)
αr15_Avr15CI	sRNA	Avr15CI2	D	2608739	2608839	-	sRNA	Agrobacterium vitis S4 chromosome 1 (NC_011989)
αr15_Avr15CI	gene	Avi_3142	D	2608951	2609238	YP_002550263.1	ArsR family transcriptional regulator	Agrobacterium vitis S4 chromosome 1 (NC_011989)
αr15_ReCFNr15a	gene	RHE_PA00141	D	152078	157177	YP_471730.1	n-6 DNA methylase	Rhizobium etli CFN 42 plasmid p42a (NC_007762)
αr15_ReCFNr15a	sRNA	ReCFNr15a	D	157296	157409	-	sRNA	Rhizobium etli CFN 42 plasmid p42a (NC_007762)
αr15_ReCFNr15a	gene	RHE_PA00143	D	157744	159486	YP_471732.1	plasmid partitioning protein	Rhizobium etli CFN 42 plasmid p42a (NC_007762)
αr15_ReCIATr15B	gene	RHECIAT_PB0000171	R	187267	187788	YP_001984434.1	excisonase protein	Rhizobium etli CIAT 652 plasmid pB (NC_010996)
αr15_ReCIATr15B	sRNA	ReCIATr15B	R	187927	188041	-	sRNA	Rhizobium etli CIAT 652 plasmid pB (NC_010996)
αr15_ReCIATr15B	gene	RHECIAT_PB0000172	R	188226	189416	YP_001984435.1	hypothetical protein	Rhizobium etli CIAT 652 plasmid pB (NC_010996)
αr15_Avr15Atc	gene	Avi_9155	D	121509	122600	YP_002542647.1	DNA polymerase III alpha chain	Agrobacterium vitis S4 plasmid pAtS4c (NC_011984)
αr15_Avr15Atc	sRNA	Avr15Atc	R	122624	122736	-	sRNA	Agrobacterium vitis S4 plasmid pAtS4c (NC_011984)
αr15_Avr15Atc	gene	Avi_9156	D	123011	123358	YP_002542648.1	helicase subunit of the DNA excision repair complex	Agrobacterium vitis S4 plasmid pAtS4c (NC_011984)
αr15_ReCFNr15d	gene	RHE_PD00155	R	172105	172731	NP_659882.1	excisonase protein	Rhizobium etli CFN 42 symbiotic plasmid p42d (NC_004041)
αr15_ReCFNr15d	sRNA	ReCFNr15d	R	172760	172874	-	sRNA	Rhizobium etli CFN 42 symbiotic plasmid p42d (NC_004041)
αr15_ReCFNr15d	gene	RHE_PD00156	R	173058	174248	NP_659881.2	hypothetical protein	Rhizobium etli CFN 42 symbiotic plasmid p42d (NC_004041)
αr15_Avr15Ate	gene	Avi_7235	D	198046	198699	YP_002539630.1	ABC transporter membrane spanning protein	Agrobacterium vitis S4 plasmid pAtS4e (NC_011981)
αr15_Avr15Ate	sRNA	Avr15Ate	D	198928	199039	-	sRNA	Agrobacterium vitis S4 plasmid pAtS4e (NC_011981)
αr15_Avr15Ate	gene	Avi_7237	D	199739	200020	YP_002539631.1	transposase	Agrobacterium vitis S4 plasmid pAtS4e (NC_011981)
αr15_AH13r15a	gene	AGROH133_14527	R	210807	211133	YP_004280311.1	XRE family transcriptional regulator	Agrobacterium sp. H13-3 plasmid pAspH13-3a (NC_015184)
αr15_AH13r15a	gene	AGROH133_14529	R	211195	211713	-	addiction module toxin	Agrobacterium sp. H13-3 plasmid pAspH13-3a (NC_015184)
αr15_AH13r15a	sRNA	AH13r15a	R	211698	211807	-	sRNA	Agrobacterium sp. H13-3 plasmid pAspH13-3a (NC_015184)
αr15_AH13r15a	gene	AGROH133_14530	R	211828	212286	YP_004280313.1	hypothetical protein	Agrobacterium sp. H13-3 plasmid pAspH13-3a (NC_015184)
αr15_Smedr15p03	gene	Smed_6375	R	39464	39784	YP_001314894.1	XRE family transcriptional regulator	Sinorhizobium medicae WSM419 plasmid pSMED03 (NC_009622)
αr15_Smedr15p03	sRNA	Smedr15p03	R	40054	40165	-	sRNA	Sinorhizobium medicae WSM419 plasmid pSMED03 (NC_009622)
αr15_Smedr15p03	gene	Smed_6376	D	40123	40425	-	hypothetical protein	Sinorhizobium medicae WSM419 plasmid pSMED03 (NC_009622)
αr15_Avr15Ti	gene	Avi_8074	R	51395	51682	YP_002540018.1	XRE family transcriptional regulator	Agrobacterium vitis S4 plasmid pTiS4 (NC_011982)
αr15_Avr15Ti	sRNA	Avr15Ti	R	52286	52397	-	sRNA	Agrobacterium vitis S4 plasmid pTiS4 (NC_011982)
αr15_Avr15Ti	gene	Avi_8076	D	52672	53013	YP_002540020.1	helicase subunit of the DNA excision repair complex	Agrobacterium vitis S4 plasmid pTiS4 (NC_011982)
αr15_Rlt1325r15p02	gene	Rleg_6607	D	35260	35928	YP_002984610.1	hypothetical protein	Rhizobium leguminosarum bv. trifolii WSM1325 plasmid pRt132502 (NC_012858)
αr15_Rlt1325r15p02	sRNA	Rlt1325r15p02	D	36176	36289	-	sRNA	Rhizobium leguminosarum bv. trifolii WSM1325 plasmid pRt132502 (NC_012858)
αr15_Rlt1325r15p02	gene	Rleg_6608	D	36740	37528	YP_002984611.1	Exonuclease RNase T and DNA polymerase II	Rhizobium leguminosarum bv. trifolii WSM1325 plasmid pRt132502 (NC_012858)
αr15_Sfr15b	gene	NGR_b01430	D	133718	133900	YP_002822362.1	hypothetical protein	Sinorhizobium fredii NGR234 plasmid pNGR234b (NC_012586)
αr15_Sfr15b	sRNA	Sfr15b	R	134078	134190	-	sRNA	Sinorhizobium fredii NGR234 plasmid pNGR234b (NC_012586)
αr15_Sfr15b	gene	NGR_b01450	R	134349	136811	YP_002822364.1	diguanylate cyclase phosphodiesterase with pas pac sensor	Sinorhizobium fredii NGR234 plasmid pNGR234b (NC_012586)
αr15_Rlvr15p11	gene	pRL110525	R	566752	566955	YP_771559.1	hypothetical protein	Rhizobium leguminosarum bv. viciae 3841 plasmid pRL11 (NC_008384)
αr15_Rlvr15p11	sRNA	Rlvr15p11	R	567053	567166	-	sRNA	Rhizobium leguminosarum bv. viciae 3841 plasmid pRL11 (NC_008384)
αr15_Rlvr15p11	gene	pRL110526	R	567397	568065	YP_771560.1	hypothetical protein	Rhizobium leguminosarum bv. viciae 3841 plasmid pRL11 (NC_008384)
αr15_Oar15p02	gene	Oant_4749	D	21546	21971	YP_001373166.1	PilT domain-containing protein	Brucella anthropi ATCC 49188 plasmid pOANT02 (NC_009670)
αr15_Oar15p02	sRNA	Oar15p02	D	22208	22320	-	sRNA	Brucella anthropi ATCC 49188 plasmid pOANT02 (NC_009670)
αr15_Oar15p02	gene	Oant_4750	D	22661	24454	YP_001373167.1	plasmid partitioning protein	Brucella anthropi ATCC 49188 plasmid pOANT02 (NC_009670)
αr15_Mlr15a	gene	msl9071	R	64650	64817	NP_085644.1	hypothetical protein	Mesorhizobium loti MAFF303099 plasmid pMLa (NC_002679)
αr15_Mlr15a	sRNA	Mlr15a	R	65044	65154	-	sRNA	Mesorhizobium loti MAFF303099 plasmid pMLa (NC_002679)
αr15_Mlr15a	gene	msl9074	R	65712	66008	NP_085645.1	hypothetical protein	Mesorhizobium loti MAFF303099 plasmid pMLa (NC_002679)
αr15_Smr15A	gene	SMa0995	R	551249	552481	NP_435782.1	transposase	Sinorhizobium meliloti 1021 plasmid pSymA (NC_003037)
αr15_Smr15A	sRNA	Smr15A	D	552873	552984	-	sRNA	Sinorhizobium meliloti 1021 plasmid pSymA (NC_003037)
αr15_Smr15A	gene	SMa0997	D	553196	553492	NP_435783.1	transposase	Sinorhizobium meliloti 1021 plasmid pSymA (NC_003037)
αr15_Arr15CII	gene	Arad_8155	D	1010459	1011472	YP_002541089.1	hypothetical protein	Agrobacterium radiobacter K84 chromosome 2 (NC_011983)
αr15_Arr15CII	sRNA	Arr15CII	R	1011511	1011624	-	sRNA	Agrobacterium radiobacter K84 chromosome 2 (NC_011983)
αr15_Arr15CII	gene	Arad_8157	D	1012367	1013791	YP_002541091.1	monooxygenase protein	Agrobacterium radiobacter K84 chromosome 2 (NC_011983)
αr15_Oar15CI	gene	Oant_1670	R	1750252	1751097	YP_001370215.1	metallophosphoesterase	Brucella anthropi ATCC 49188 chromosome 1 (NC_009667)
αr15_Oar15CI	sRNA	Oar15CI	D	1751482	1751598	-	sRNA	Brucella anthropi ATCC 49188 chromosome 1 (NC_009667)
αr15_Oar15CI	gene	Oant_1671	D	1752063	1753466	YP_001370216.1	RNA-directed DNA polymerase	Brucella anthropi ATCC 49188 chromosome 1 (NC_009667)
αr15_ReCIATr15pC	gene	RHECIAT_PC0000855	R	938497	939639	YP_001985475.1	acyltransferase 3	Rhizobium etli CIAT 652 plasmid pC (NC_010997)
αr15_ReCIATr15pC	sRNA	ReCIATr15pC	D	941345	941452	-	sRNA	Rhizobium etli CIAT 652 plasmid pC (NC_010997)
αr15_ReCIATr15pC	gene	RHECIAT_PC0000856	R	941811	945572	YP_001985476.1	hemolysin-type calcium-binding protein	Rhizobium etli CIAT 652 plasmid pC (NC_010997)
αr15_Oar15CII	gene	Oant_3861	R	1269354	1269818	YP_001372395.1	hypothetical protein	Brucella anthropi ATCC 49188 chromosome 2 (NC_009668)
αr15_Oar15CII	sRNA	Oar15CII	D	1270083	1270191	-	sRNA	Brucella anthropi ATCC 49188 chromosome 2 (NC_009668)
αr15_Oar15CII	gene	Oant_3862	R	1270409	1273222	YP_001372396.1	glycine dehydrogenase	Brucella anthropi ATCC 49188 chromosome 2 (NC_009668)
αr15_Bm23445r15CII	gene	BSUIS_B0713	R	695738	695851	YP_001622510.1	hypothetical protein	Brucella suis ATCC 23445 chromosome II (NC_010167)
αr15_Bm23445r15CII	sRNA	Bm23445r15CII	D	696081	696188	-	sRNA	Brucella suis ATCC 23445 chromosome II (NC_010167)
αr15_Bm23445r15CII	gene	BSUIS_B0714	D	696129	696196	-	unknown	Brucella suis ATCC 23445 chromosome II (NC_010167)
αr15_Bm23445r15CII	gene	BSUIS_B0715	R	696787	699585	YP_001622511.1	glycine dehydrogenase	Brucella suis ATCC 23445 chromosome II (NC_010167)
αr15_Bm16Mr15CII	gene	BMEII0561	D	586104	588902	NP_541539.1	glycine dehydrogenase	Brucella melitensis bv. 1 str. 16M chromosome II (NC_003318)
αr15_Bm16Mr15CII	sRNA	Bm16Mr15CII	R	589501	589608	-	sRNA	Brucella melitensis bv. 1 str. 16M chromosome II (NC_003318)
αr15_Bm16Mr15CII	gene	BMEII0562	D	589690	589950	NP_541540.1	hypothetical protein	Brucella melitensis bv. 1 str. 16M chromosome II (NC_003318)
αr15_BaS19r15CII	gene	BAbS19_II04850	D	504658	507456	YP_001932428.1	glycine dehydrogenase	Brucella abortus S19 chromosome 2 (NC_010740)
αr15_BaS19r15CII	sRNA	BaS19r15CII	R	508055	508162	-	sRNA	Brucella abortus S19 chromosome 2 (NC_010740)
αr15_BaS19r15CII	gene	BAbS19_II04860	D	508392	508505	YP_001932429.1	hypothetical protein	Brucella abortus S19 chromosome 2 (NC_010740)
αr15_Bm23457r15CII	gene	BMEA_B0698	D	686472	686966	YP_002734467.1	proline dehydrogenase transcriptional activator	Brucella melitensis ATCC 23457 chromosome II (NC_012442)
αr15_Bm23457r15CII	sRNA	Bm23457r15CII	D	687290	687397	-	sRNA	Brucella melitensis ATCC 23457 chromosome II (NC_012442)
αr15_Bm23457r15CII	gene	BMEA_B0701	R	687996	690794	YP_002734468.1	glycine dehydrogenase	Brucella melitensis ATCC 23457 chromosome II (NC_012442)
αr15_Bmir15CII	gene	BMI_II717	R	708784	709020	YP_003105497.1	hypothetical protein	Brucella microti CCM 4915 chromosome 2 (NC_013118)
αr15_Bmir15CII	sRNA	Bmir15CII	D	709102	709209	-	sRNA	Brucella microti CCM 4915 chromosome 2 (NC_013118)
αr15_Bmir15CII	gene	BMI_II718	R	709832	712630	YP_003105498.1	glycine dehydrogenase	Brucella microti CCM 4915 chromosome 2 (NC_013118)
αr15_Bs1330r15CII	gene	BRA0724	R	707842	707955	NP_699901.1	hypothetical protein	Brucella suis 1330 chromosome II (NC_004311)
αr15_Bs1330r15CII	sRNA	Bs1330r15CII	D	708185	708292	-	sRNA	Brucella suis 1330 chromosome II (NC_004311)
αr15_Bs1330r15CII	gene	BRA0725	R	708891	711689	NP_699902.1	glycine dehydrogenase	Brucella suis 1330 chromosome II (NC_004311)
αr15_Ba19941r15CII	gene	BruAb2_0506	D	505454	508252	YP_223286.1	glycine dehydrogenase	Brucella abortus bv. 1 str. 9-941 chromosome II (NC_006933)
αr15_Ba19941r15CII	sRNA	Ba19941r15CII	R	508851	508958	-	sRNA	Brucella abortus bv. 1 str. 9-941 chromosome II (NC_006933)
αr15_Ba19941r15CII	gene	BruAb2_0507	D	509188	509301	YP_223287.1	hypothetical protein	Brucella abortus bv. 1 str. 9-941 chromosome II (NC_006933)
αr15_Bmαr15CII	gene	BAB2_0515	D	505442	508240	YP_418705.1	glycine dehydrogenase	Brucella melitensis biovar Abortus 2308 chromosome II (NC_007624)
αr15_Bmαr15CII	sRNA	Bmαr15CII	R	508839	508946	-	sRNA	Brucella melitensis biovar Abortus 2308 chromosome II (NC_007624)
αr15_Bmαr15CII	gene	BAB2_0516	D	509028	509264	YP_418706.1	hypothetical protein	Brucella melitensis biovar Abortus 2308 chromosome II (NC_007624)
αr15_Bcr15CII	gene	BCAN_B0729	D	706646	707140	YP_001594668.1	proline dehydrogenase transcriptional activator	Brucella canis ATCC 23365 chromosome II (NC_010104)
αr15_Bcr15CII	sRNA	Bcr15CII	D	707465	707572	-	sRNA	Brucella canis ATCC 23365 chromosome II (NC_010104)
αr15_Bcr15CII	gene	BCAN_B0730	R	708171	710969	YP_001594669.1	glycine dehydrogenase	Brucella canis ATCC 23365 chromosome II (NC_010104)
αr15_Bor15CI2	gene	BOV_1448	D	1459218	1460420	YP_001259376.1	aspartate aminotransferase	Brucella ovis ATCC 25840 chromosome I (NC_009505)
αr15_Bor15CI2	sRNA	Bor15CI2	R	1460506	1460624	-	sRNA	Brucella ovis ATCC 25840 chromosome I (NC_009505)
αr15_Bor15CI2	gene	BOV_1449	R	1460890	1461795	YP_001259377.1	LysR family transcriptional regulator	Brucella ovis ATCC 25840 chromosome I (NC_009505)
αr15_Bcr15CI2	gene	BCAN_A1532	D	1450681	1451883	YP_001593329.1	aspartate aminotransferase	Brucella canis ATCC 23365 chromosome I (NC_010103)
αr15_Bcr15CI2	sRNA	Bcr15CI2	R	1451969	1452087	-	sRNA	Brucella canis ATCC 23365 chromosome I (NC_010103)
αr15_Bcr15CI2	gene	BCAN_A1535	R	1452353	1453258	YP_001593332.1	transcription regulator protein	Brucella canis ATCC 23365 chromosome I (NC_010103)
αr15_Bmir15CI2	gene	BMI_I1510	D	1460010	1461212	YP_003107423.1	aspartate aminotransferase	Brucella microti CCM 4915 chromosome 1 (NC_013119)
αr15_Bmir15CI2	sRNA	Bmir15CI2	R	1461298	1461416	-	sRNA	Brucella microti CCM 4915 chromosome 1 (NC_013119)
αr15_Bmir15CI2	gene	BMI_I1512	R	1461682	1462587	YP_003107425.1	LysR family transcriptional regulator	Brucella microti CCM 4915 chromosome 1 (NC_013119)
αr15_Bs1330r15CI2	gene	BR1495	D	1451723	1452925	NP_698491.1	aspartate aminotransferase	Brucella suis 1330 chromosome I (NC_004310)
αr15_Bs1330r15CI2	sRNA	Bs1330r15CI2	R	1453011	1453129	-	sRNA	Brucella suis 1330 chromosome I (NC_004310)
αr15_Bs1330r15CI2	gene	BR1498	R	1453395	1454300	NP_698494.1	LysR family transcriptional regulator	Brucella suis 1330 chromosome I (NC_004310)
αr15_Bor15CII	sRNA	Bor15CII	D	709415	709524	-	sRNA	Brucella ovis ATCC 25840 chromosome II (NC_009504)
αr15_Bor15CII	gene	BOV_A0677	R	704750	708432	-	proline dehydrogenase transcriptional activator	Brucella ovis ATCC 25840 chromosome II (NC_009504)
αr15_Bor15CII	gene	BOV_A0679	R	710122	712920	YP_001257680.1	glycine dehydrogenase	Brucella ovis ATCC 25840 chromosome II (NC_009504)
αr15_Bm23445r15CI2	gene	BSUIS_A1552	D	1472504	1473706	YP_001628154.1	aspartate aminotransferase	Brucella suis ATCC 23445 chromosome I (NC_010169)
αr15_Bm23445r15CI2	sRNA	Bm23445r15CI2	R	1473791	1473909	-	sRNA	Brucella suis ATCC 23445 chromosome I (NC_010169)
αr15_Bm23445r15CI2	gene	BSUIS_A1554	R	1474175	1475080	YP_001628156.1	hypothetical protein	Brucella suis ATCC 23445 chromosome I (NC_010169)
αr15_BaS19r15CI2	gene	BAbS19_I14120	D	1468120	1469322	YP_001935379.1	aspartate aminotransferase	Brucella abortus S19 chromosome 1 (NC_010742)
αr15_BaS19r15CI2	sRNA	BaS19r15CI2	R	1469407	1469525	-	sRNA	Brucella abortus S19 chromosome 1 (NC_010742)
αr15_BaS19r15CI2	gene	BAbS19_I14130	D	1469632	1469739	YP_001935380.1	hypothetical protein	Brucella abortus S19 chromosome 1 (NC_010742)
αr15_Ba19941r15CI2	gene	BruAb1_1488	D	1469786	1470988	YP_222177.1	aspartate aminotransferase	Brucella abortus bv. 1 str. 9-941 chromosome I (NC_006932)
αr15_Ba19941r15CI2	sRNA	Ba19941r15CI2	R	1471073	1471191	-	sRNA	Brucella abortus bv. 1 str. 9-941 chromosome I (NC_006932)
αr15_Ba19941r15CI2	gene	BruAb1_1490	D	1471190	1471405	YP_222179.1	hypothetical protein	Brucella abortus bv. 1 str. 9-941 chromosome I (NC_006932)
αr15_Bmαr15CI2	gene	BAB1_1514	D	1466940	1468142	YP_414880.1	aspartate aminotransferase	Brucella melitensis biovar Abortus 2308 chromosome I (NC_007618)
αr15_Bmαr15CI2	sRNA	Bmαr15CI2	R	1468227	1468345	-	sRNA	Brucella melitensis biovar Abortus 2308 chromosome I (NC_007618)
αr15_Bmαr15CI2	gene	BAB1_1516	D	1468344	1468559	YP_414882.1	hypothetical protein	Brucella melitensis biovar Abortus 2308 chromosome I (NC_007618)
αr15_Bcr15CI1	gene	BCAN_A1457	R	1377955	1378815	YP_001593259.1	UDP-3-O-[3-hydroxymyristoyl] N-acetylglucosamine deacetylase	Brucella canis ATCC 23365 chromosome I (NC_010103)
αr15_Bcr15CI1	sRNA	Bcr15CI1	R	1379297	1379398	-	sRNA	Brucella canis ATCC 23365 chromosome I (NC_010103)
αr15_Bcr15CI1	sRNA	BCAN_A1458	R	1379355	1381055	YP_001593260.1	cell division protein Fts	Brucella canis ATCC 23365 chromosome I (NC_010103)
αr15_Bcr15CI1	gene	BCAN_A1459	R	1381152	1382474	YP_001593261.1	cell division protein Fts	Brucella canis ATCC 23365 chromosome I (NC_010103)
αr15_Bm23445r15CI1	gene	BSUIS_A1476	D	1400706	1400831	YP_001628084.1	hypothetical protein	Brucella suis ATCC 23445 chromosome I (NC_010169)
αr15_Bm23445r15CI1	sRNA	Bm23445r15CI1	R	1401085	1401186	-	sRNA	Brucella suis ATCC 23445 chromosome I (NC_010169)
αr15_Bm23445r15CI1	gene	BSUIS_A1477	R	1401143	1402843	YP_001628085.1	cell division protein Fts	Brucella suis ATCC 23445 chromosome I (NC_010169)
αr15_Bm23445r15CI1	gene	BSUIS_A1478	R	1402940	1404262	YP_001628086.1	cell division protein Fts	Brucella suis ATCC 23445 chromosome I (NC_010169)
αr15_Bm16Mr15CI	gene	BMEI0585	D	606025	607641	NP_539502.1	cell division protein Fts	Brucella melitensis bv. 1 str. 16M chromosome I (NC_003317)
αr15_Bm16Mr15CI	sRNA	Bm16Mr15CI	D	607684	607785	-	sRNA	Brucella melitensis bv. 1 str. 16M chromosome I (NC_003317)
αr15_Bm16Mr15CI	gene	BMEI0586	D	608267	609127	NP_539503.1	UDP-3-O-[3-hydroxymyristoyl] N-acetylglucosamine deacetylase	Brucella melitensis bv. 1 str. 16M chromosome I (NC_003317)
αr15_BaS19r15CI1	gene	BAbS19_I13490	R	1395452	1396312	YP_001935318.1	UDP-3-O-[3-hydroxymyristoyl] N-acetylglucosamine deacetylase	Brucella abortus S19 chromosome 1 (NC_010742)
αr15_BaS19r15CI1	gene	BAbS19_I13500	R	1396852	1398552	YP_001935319.1	cell division protein Fts	Brucella abortus S19 chromosome 1 (NC_010742)
αr15_BaS19r15CI1	sRNA	BaS19r15CI1	R	1396794	1396895	-	sRNA	Brucella abortus S19 chromosome 1 (NC_010742)
αr15_BaS19r15CI1	gene	BAbS19_I13510	R	1398649	1399971	YP_001935320.1	heat shock protein Hsp7	Brucella abortus S19 chromosome 1 (NC_010742)
αr15_Bm23457r15CI	gene	BMEA_A1472	R	1399299	1400159	YP_002733139.1	UDP-3-O-[3-hydroxymyristoyl] N-acetylglucosamine deacetylase	Brucella melitensis ATCC 23457 chromosome I (NC_012441)
αr15_Bm23457r15CI	sRNA	Bm23457r15CI	R	1400641	1400742	-	sRNA	Brucella melitensis ATCC 23457 chromosome I (NC_012441)
αr15_Bm23457r15CI	gene	BMEA_A1473	R	1400699	1402399	YP_002733140.1	cell division protein Fts	Brucella melitensis ATCC 23457 chromosome I (NC_012441)
αr15_Bm23457r15CI	gene	BMEA_A1474	R	1402496	1403818	YP_002733141.1	cell division protein Fts	Brucella melitensis ATCC 23457 chromosome I (NC_012441)
αr15_Bmir15CI1	gene	BMI_I1436	R	1386434	1387294	YP_003107351.1	UDP-3-O-[3-hydroxymyristoyl] N-acetylglucosamine deacetylase	Brucella microti CCM 4915 chromosome 1 (NC_013119)
αr15_Bmir15CI1	sRNA	Bmir15CI1	R	1387776	1387877	-	sRNA	Brucella microti CCM 4915 chromosome 1 (NC_013119)
αr15_Bmir15CI1	gene	BMI_I1437	R	1387834	1389534	YP_003107352.1	cell division protein Fts	Brucella microti CCM 4915 chromosome 1 (NC_013119)
αr15_Bmir15CI1	gene	BMI_I1438	R	1389631	1390953	YP_003107353.1	cell division protein Fts	Brucella microti CCM 4915 chromosome 1 (NC_013119)
αr15_Bs1330r15CI1	gene	BR1424	R	1379039	1379899	NP_698422.1	UDP-3-O-[3-hydroxymyristoyl] N-acetylglucosamine deacetylase	Brucella suis 1330 chromosome I (NC_004310)
αr15_Bs1330r15CI1	sRNA	Bs1330r15CI1	R	1380381	1380482	-	sRNA	Brucella suis 1330 chromosome I (NC_004310)
αr15_Bs1330r15CI1	gene	BR1425	R	1380439	1382139	NP_698423.1	cell division protein Fts	Brucella suis 1330 chromosome I (NC_004310)
αr15_Bs1330r15CI1	gene	BR1426	R	1382236	1383558	NP_698424.1	cell division protein Fts	Brucella suis 1330 chromosome I (NC_004310)
αr15_Ba19941r15CI1	gene	BruAb1_1419	R	1397122	1397982	YP_222110.1	UDP-3-O-[3-hydroxymyristoyl] N-acetylglucosamine deacetylase	Brucella abortus bv. 1 str. 9-941 chromosome I (NC_006932)
αr15_Ba19941r15CI1	sRNA	Ba19941r15CI1	R	1398464	1398565	-	sRNA	Brucella abortus bv. 1 str. 9-941 chromosome I (NC_006932)
αr15_Ba19941r15CI1	gene	BruAb1_1420	R	1398522	1400222	YP_222111.1	cell division protein Fts	Brucella abortus bv. 1 str. 9-941 chromosome I (NC_006932)
αr15_Ba19941r15CI1	gene	BruAb1_1421	R	1400319	1401641	YP_222112.1	cell division protein Fts	Brucella abortus bv. 1 str. 9-941 chromosome I (NC_006932)
αr15_Bmαr15CI1	gene	BAB1_1443	R	1394272	1395132	YP_414815.1	UDP-3-O-[3-hydroxymyristoyl] N-acetylglucosamine deacetylase	Brucella melitensis biovar Abortus 2308 chromosome I (NC_007618)
αr15_Bmαr15CI1	sRNA	Bmαr15CI1	R	1395614	1395715	-	sRNA	Brucella melitensis biovar Abortus 2308 chromosome I (NC_007618)
αr15_Bmαr15CI1	gene	BAB1_1444	R	1395672	1397372	YP_414816.1	cell division protein Fts	Brucella melitensis biovar Abortus 2308 chromosome I (NC_007618)
αr15_Bmαr15CI1	gene	BAB1_1445	R	1397469	1398791	YP_414817.1	heat shock protein Hsp7	Brucella melitensis biovar Abortus 2308 chromosome I (NC_007618)
αr15_Jspr15C	gene	mma_2445	R	2769080	2769601	YP_001354135.1	phosphinothricin N-acetyltransferas	Janthinobacterium sp. Marseille (NC_009659)
αr15_Jspr15C	sRNA	Jspr15C	R	2769681	2769776	-	sRNA	Janthinobacterium sp. Marseille (NC_009659)
αr15_Jspr15C	gene	mma_2446	R	2769784	2770767	YP_001354136.1	tricarboxylate binding receptor	Janthinobacterium sp. Marseille (NC_009659)
αr15_Bor15CI1	gene	BOV_1381	D	1387334	1387726	YP_001259317.1	transposase Orf	Brucella ovis ATCC 25840 chromosome I (NC_009505)
αr15_Bor15CI1	sRNA	Bor15CI1	R	1387928	1388029	-	sRNA	Brucella ovis ATCC 25840 chromosome I (NC_009505)
αr15_Bor15CI1	gene	BOV_1382	R	1387986	1389686	YP_001259318.1	cell division protein Fts	Brucella ovis ATCC 25840 chromosome I (NC_009505)
αr15_Bor15CI1	gene	BOV_1383	R	1389783	1391105	YP_001259319.1	cell division protein Fts	Brucella ovis ATCC 25840 chromosome I (NC_009505)
