= Glutamine synthetase =

Class of enzymes

glutamate—ammonia ligase
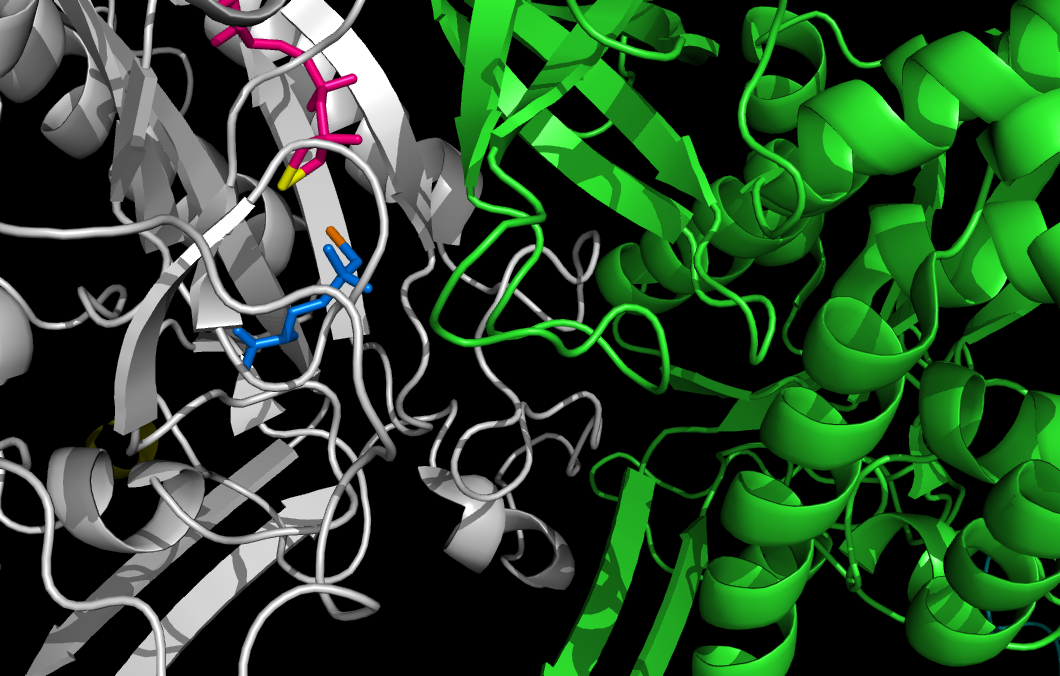
- Active site between two monomers of glutamine synthetase from Salmonella typhimurium. Cation binding sites are yellow and orange; ADP is pink; phosphinothricin is blue.

Identifiers
- EC no.: 6.3.1.2
- CAS no.: 9023-70-5

Databases
- BRENDA: enzyme data
- ExPASy: NiceZyme view
- KEGG: enzyme entry
- MetaCyc: metabolic pathway
- Rhea: reactions
- PDB structures: RCSB PDB PDBe PDBsum
- Gene Ontology: AmiGO / QuickGO
Search
- PMC: articles
- PubMed: articles
- NCBI: proteins

Glutamine synthetase, beta-Grasp domain

Identifiers
- Symbol: Gln-synt_N
- Pfam: PF03951
- InterPro: IPR008147
- PROSITE: PDOC00162
- SCOP2: 2gls / SCOPe / SUPFAM
Available protein structures:
- PDB: 1f1h, 1f52, 1fpy, 1hto, 1lgr, 2bvc, 2gls, 2qc8, 2ojw IPR008147 PF03951 (ECOD; PDBsum)
- AlphaFold: IPR008147; PF03951

Glutamine synthetase, catalytic domain
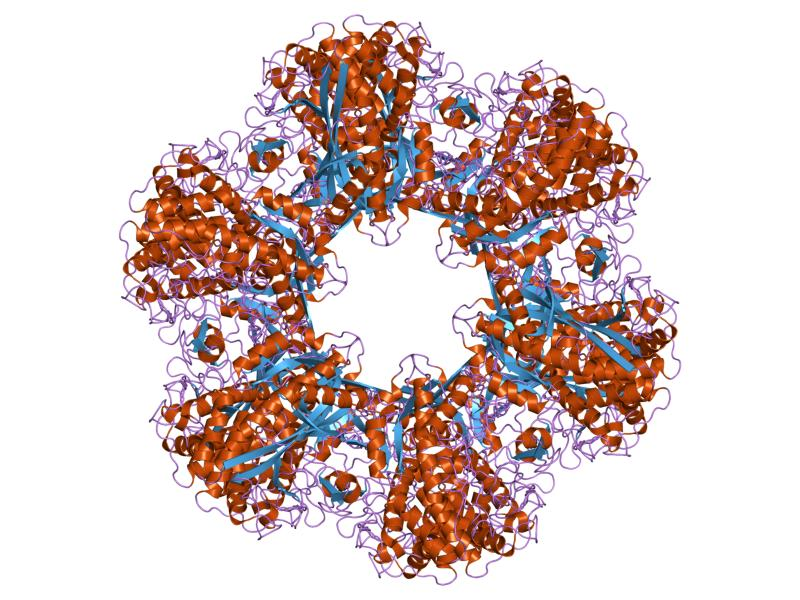
- 12-subunit enzyme glutamine synthetase from Salmonella typhimurium.

Identifiers
- Symbol: Gln-synt_C
- Pfam: PF00120
- Pfam clan: CL0286
- InterPro: IPR008146
- PROSITE: PDOC00162
- SCOP2: 2gls / SCOPe / SUPFAM
Available protein structures:
- PDB: 1f1h, 1f52, 1fpy, 1hto, 1lgr, 2bvc, 2gls, 2qc8, 2ojw IPR008146 PF00120 (ECOD; PDBsum)
- AlphaFold: IPR008146; PF00120

glutamate-ammonia ligase (glutamine synthetase)

Identifiers
- Symbol: GLUL
- Alt. symbols: GLNS
- NCBI gene: 2752
- HGNC: 4341
- OMIM: 138290
- PDB: 2qc8
- RefSeq: NM_002065
- UniProt: P15104

Other data
- EC number: 6.3.1.2
- Locus: Chr. 1 q31
Search for
- Structures: Swiss-model
- Domains: InterPro

Glutamine synthetase (GS) (EC 6.3.1.2) is an enzyme that catalyzes the condensation of glutamate and ammonia to form glutamine: Glutamate + ATP + NH_{3} → Glutamine + ADP + phosphate

Glutamine synthetase catalyzed reaction

Glutamine synthetase uses ammonia produced by nitrate reduction, amino acid degradation, and photorespiration. The amide group of glutamate is a nitrogen source for the synthesis of glutamine pathway metabolites.

Other reactions may take place via GS. Competition between ammonium ion and water, their binding affinities, and the concentration of ammonium ion, influences glutamine synthesis and glutamine hydrolysis. Glutamine is formed if an ammonium ion attacks the acyl-phosphate intermediate, while glutamate is remade if water attacks the intermediate. Ammonium ion binds more strongly than water to GS due to electrostatic forces between a cation and a negatively charged pocket. Another possible reaction is upon NH_{2}OH binding to GS, rather than NH_{4}+, yields γ-glutamylhydroxamate.

== Structure ==
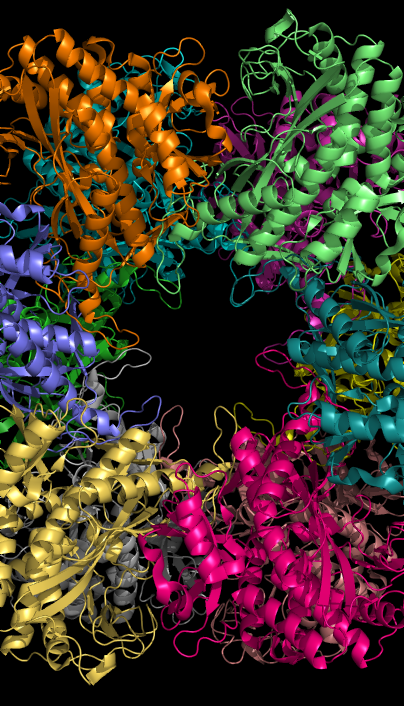
Glutamine synthetase, 12 subunits

Glutamine synthetase can be composed of 8, 10, or 12 identical subunits separated into two face-to-face rings. Bacterial GS are dodecamers with 12 active sites between each monomer. Each active site creates a ‘tunnel’ which is the site of three distinct substrate binding sites: nucleotide, ammonium ion, and amino acid. ATP binds to the top of the bifunnel that opens to the external surface of GS. Glutamate binds at the bottom of the active site. The middle of the bifunnel contains two sites in which divalent cations bind (Mn+2 or Mg+2). One cation binding site is involved in phosphoryl transfer of ATP to glutamate, while the second stabilizes active GS and helps with the binding of glutamate.

Hydrogen bonding and hydrophobic interactions hold the two rings of GS together. Each subunit possesses a C-terminus and an N-terminus in its sequence. The C-terminus (helical thong) stabilizes the GS structure by inserting into the hydrophobic region of the subunit across in the other ring. The N-terminus is exposed to the solvent. In addition, the central channel is formed via six four-stranded β-sheets composed of anti-parallel loops from the twelve subunits.

== Mechanism ==
GS catalyzes the ATP-dependent condensation of glutamate with ammonia to yield glutamine. The conversion occurs in two steps. ATP phosphorylates glutamate to form γ-glutamyl phosphate. This acyl-phosphate intermediate reacts with ammonia, forming glutamine, displacing phosphate (P_{i}). ADP and P_{i} do not dissociate until ammonia binds and glutamine is released.

ATP binds first to the top of the active site near a cation binding site, while glutamate binds near the second cation binding site at the bottom of the active site. The presence of ADP causes a conformational shift in GS that stabilizes the γ-glutamyl phosphate moiety. Ammonium binds strongly to GS only if the acyl-phosphate intermediate is present. Ammonium, rather than ammonia, binds to GS because the binding site is polar and exposed to solvent. In the second step, deprotonation of ammonium allows ammonia to attack the intermediate from its nearby site to form glutamine. Phosphate leaves through the top of the active site, while glutamine leaves through the bottom (between two rings).

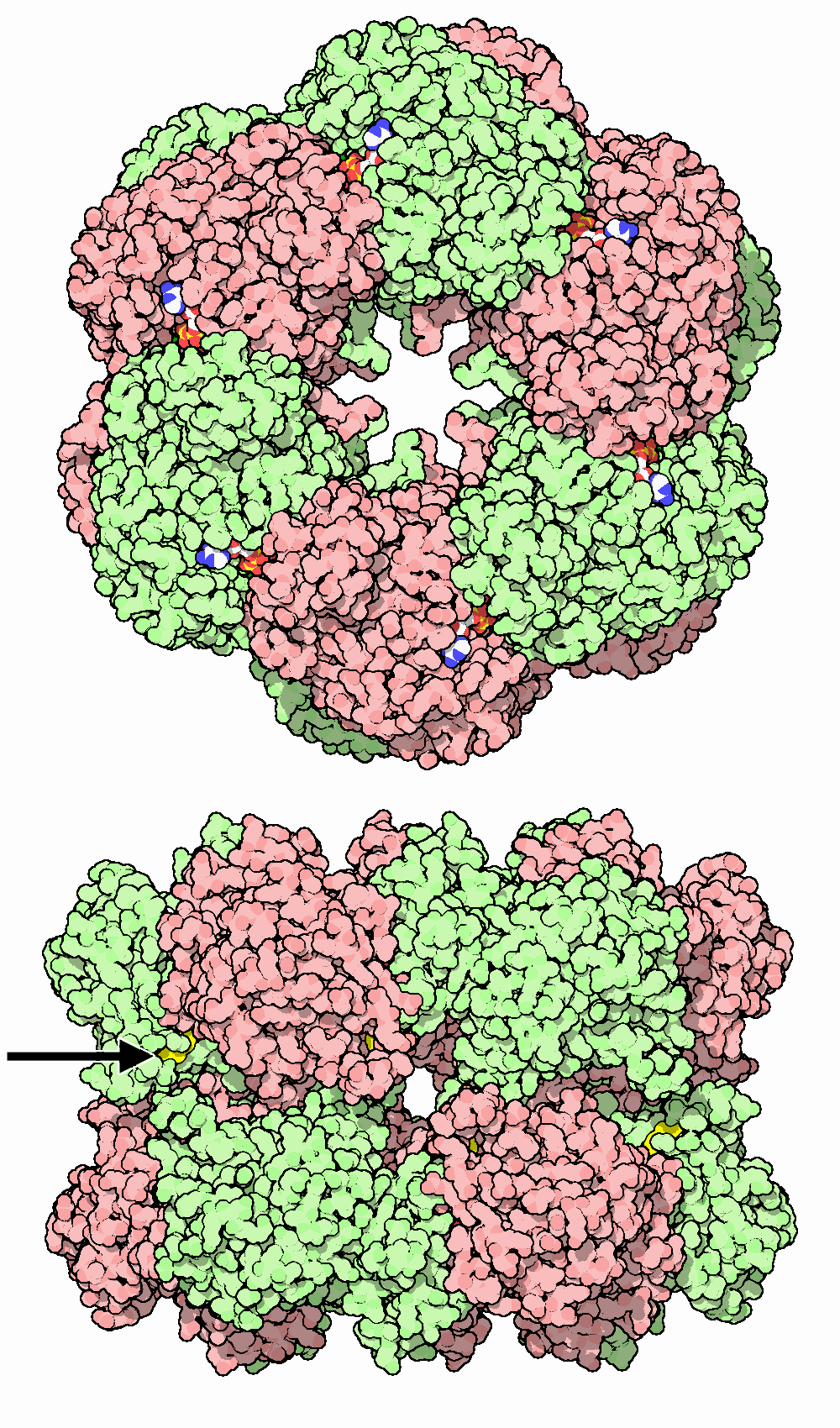
Two views of glutamine synthetase PDB ID: 1FPY

== Biological function ==
GS is present predominantly in the brain, kidneys, and liver. GS in the brain participates in the metabolic regulation of glutamate, the detoxification of brain ammonia, the assimilation of ammonia, recyclization of neurotransmitters, and termination of neurotransmitter signals. GS, in the brain, is found primarily in astrocytes. Astrocytes protect neurons against excitotoxicity by taking up excess ammonia and glutamate. In hyperammonemic environments (high levels of ammonia), astroglial swelling occurs. Different perspectives have approached the problem of astroglial swelling. One study shows that morphological changes occur that increase GS expression in glutamatergic areas or other adaptations that alleviates high levels of glutamate and ammonia. Another perspective is that astrocyte swelling is due to glutamine accumulation. To prevent increased levels of cortical glutamate and cortical water content, a study has been conducted to prevent GS activity in rats by the use of MSO.

== Classes ==
There seem to be three different classes of GS:

- Class I enzymes (GSI) are specific to prokaryotes, and are oligomers of 12 identical subunits. The activity of GSI-type enzyme is controlled by the adenylation of a tyrosine residue. The adenylated enzyme is inactive.
- Class II enzymes (GSII) are found in eukaryotes and in bacteria belonging to the Rhizobiaceae, Frankiaceae, and Streptomycetaceae families (these bacteria have also a class-I GS). GSII are decamer of identical subunits.PDB: 2OJW.

Plants have two or more isozymes of GSII, one of the isozymes is translocated into the chloroplast. Another form is cytosolic. The cytosolic GS gene translation is regulated by its 5' untranslated region (UTR), while its 3' UTR plays role in transcript turnover.

- Class III enzymes (GSIII) have, currently, only been found in Bacteroides fragilis and in Butyrivibrio fibrisolvens. It is a double-ringed dodecamer of identical chains. It is much larger (about 700 amino acids) than the GSI (450 to 470 amino acids) or GSII (350 to 420 amino acids) enzymes.

While the three classes of GSs are clearly structurally related, the sequence similarities are not so extensive.

== Regulation and inhibition ==
GS is subject to reversible covalent modification. Tyr^{397} of all 12 subunits can undergo adenylylation or deadenylylation by adenylyl transferase (AT), a bifunctional regulatory enzyme. Adenylylation is a post-translational modification involving the covalent attachment of AMP to a protein side chain. Each adenylylation requires an ATP and complete inhibition of GS requires 12 ATP. Deadenylylation by AT involves phosphorolytic removal of the Tyr-linked adenylyl groups as ADP. AT activity is influenced by the regulatory protein that is associated with it: P_{II}, a 44-kD trimer. P_{II} also undergoes post-translational modification by uridylyl transferase, thus P_{II} has two forms. The state of P_{II} dictates the activity of adenylyl transferase. If P_{II} is not uridylylated, then it will take on the P_{IIA} form. The AT:P_{IIA} complex will deactivate GS by adenylylation. If P_{II} is uridylylated, then it will take on the P_{IID} form. The AT:P_{IID} complex will activate GS by deadenylylation. The AT:P_{IIA} and AT:P_{IID} complexes are allosterically regulated in a reciprocal fashion by α-ketoglutarate (α-KG) and glutamine (Gln). Gln will activate AT:P_{IIA} activity and inhibits AT:P_{IID}, leading to adenylylation and subsequent deactivation of GS. Furthermore, Gln favors the conversion of P_{IID} to P_{IIA}. The effects of α-KG on the complexes are opposite. In the majority of gram-negative bacteria, GS can be modified by adenylylation (some cyanobacteria and green algae or exceptions).

Inhibition of GS has largely focused on amino site ligands. Other inhibitors are the result of glutamine metabolism: tryptophan, histidine, carbamoyl phosphate, glucosamine-6-phosphate, cytidine triphosphate (CTP), and adenosine monophosphate (AMP). Other inhibitors/regulators are glycine and alanine. Alanine, glycine, and serine bind to the glutamate substrate site. GDP, AMP, ADP bind to the ATP site. L-serine, L-alanine, and glycine bind to the site for L-glutamate in unadenylated GS. The four amino acids bind to the site by their common atoms, “the main chain” of amino acids. Glutamate is another product of glutamine metabolism; however, glutamate is a substrate for GS inhibiting it to act as a regulator to GS.2 Each inhibitor can reduce the activity of the enzyme; once all final glutamine metabolites are bound to GS, the activity of GS is almost completely inhibited. Many inhibitory input signals allows for fine tuning of GS by reflecting nitrogen levels in the organism.

Feedback regulation distinguishes the difference between two eukaryotic types of GS: brain and non-brain tissues. Non-brain GS responds to end-product feedback inhibition, while brain GS does not. High concentrations of glutamine-dependent metabolites should inhibit GS activity, while low concentrations should activate GS activity.

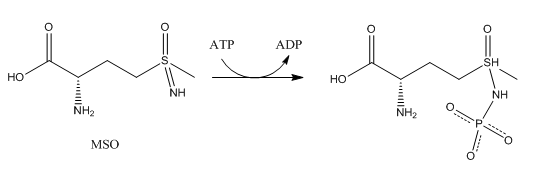
Methionine sulfoximine acting as an inhibitor to the glutamate binding site

Inhibitors:

- Methionine sulfoximine (MSO): MSO is an inhibitor that binds to the glutamate site. Bound to GS, MSO is phosphorylated by ATP that results in an irreversible, non-covalent inhibition of GS. The S-isomer configuration is more inhibitory. Glutamate entry is blocked into the active site by a stabilization of the flexible loop in the active site by MSO.
- Phosphinothricin(PPT, Glufosinate): Phosphinothricin is an inhibitor that binds to the glutamate site. Glufosinate is used as an herbicide. Glufosinate treated plants die due to a buildup of ammonia and a cessation of photosynthesis.
- Many synthetic inhibitors are available today.

Research on E. coli revealed that GS is regulated through gene expression. The gene that encodes the GS subunit is designated glnA. Transcription of glnA is dependent on NR_{I} (a specific transcriptional enhancer). Active transcription occurs if NR_{I} is in its phosphorylated form, designated NR_{I}-P. Phosphorylation of NR_{I} is catalyzed by NR_{II}, a protein kinase. If NR_{II} is complexed with P_{IIA} then it will function as a phosphatase and NR_{I}-P is converted back to NR_{I}. In this case, transcription of glnA ceases.

GS is subject to completely different regulatory mechanisms in cyanobacteria. Instead of the common NtrC-NtrB two component system, cyanobacteria harbour the transcriptional regulator NtcA which is restricted to this clade and controls expression of GS and a multitude of genes involved in nitrogen metabolism. Moreover, GS in cyanobacteria is not covalently modified to raise sensitivity for feedback inhibition. Instead, GS in Cyanobacteria is inhibited by small proteins, termed GS inactivating factors (IFs) whose transcription is negatively regulated by NtcA. These inactivating factors are furthermore regulated by different Non-coding RNAs: The sRNA NsiR4 interacts with the 5'UTR of the mRNA of the GS inactivating factor IF7 (gifA mRNA) and reduces its expression. NsiR4 expression is under positive control of the nitrogen control transcription factor NtcA. In addition, expression of the GS inactivating factor IF17 is controlled by a glutamine-binding riboswitch.
