= Escherichia coli sRNA =

Escherichia coli contains a number of small RNAs located in intergenic regions of its genome. The presence of at least 55 of these has been verified experimentally. 275 potential sRNA-encoding loci were identified computationally using the QRNA program. These loci will include false positives, so the number of sRNA genes in E. coli is likely to be less than 275. A computational screen based on promoter sequences recognised by the sigma factor sigma 70 and on Rho-independent terminators predicted 24 putative sRNA genes, 14 of these were verified experimentally by northern blotting. The experimentally verified sRNAs included the well characterised sRNAs RprA and RyhB. Many of the sRNAs identified in this screen, including RprA, RyhB, SraB and SraL, are only expressed in the stationary phase of bacterial cell growth. A screen for sRNA genes based on homology to Salmonella and Klebsiella identified 59 candidate sRNA genes. From this set of candidate genes, microarray analysis and northern blotting confirmed the existence of 17 previously undescribed sRNAs, many of which bind to the chaperone protein Hfq and regulate the translation of RpoS (Sigma 38). UptR sRNA transcribed from the uptR gene is implicated in suppressing extracytoplasmic toxicity by reducing the amount of membrane-bound toxic hybrid protein.

Cell motility enhancing sRNA named Esr41, was discovered in intergenic region of pathogenic enterohemorrhagic E.coli (EHEC) O157:H7 Sakai. Esr41 sequence is not present in nonpathogenic E. coli K12, but the sRNA can induce cell motility in K12 as well, suggesting that target genes controlled by Esr41 are present in both E.coli.

Trans-encoded small RNA RalA has 16 nucleotides complementary to coding region of toxin RalR mRNA. RalA functions as an antitoxin by preventing translation of RalR (a non-specific endonuclease that cleaves methylated and unmethylated DNA). Its activity requires RNA chaperone Hfq. RalR and RalA form a type I toxin-antitoxin (TA) system. RalR/RaLA TA locus is responsible for resistance to the antibiotic fosfomycin in E.coli.

Deep sequencing of RNA expressed during chemical stress and high cell density fermentation discovered 253 novel intergenic transcripts adding to roughly 200 intergenic sRNAs previously described in E. coli. Several of the sRNAs exhibited specific expression patterns during high cell density fermentation and are differentially expressed in the presence of multiple chemicals, suggesting they may play roles during stress conditions. The novel sRNAs showing differential expression in several stress conditions were: ES003, ES036, ES056, ES098, ES173, ES180, ES205, ES220, ES222, ES239.

Esre sRNA, for "essential small RNA in E. coli", is located in 3′ moiety of yigP gene (also known as ubiJ), which is involved in coenzyme Q8 biosynthesis in Escherichia coli and Salmonella enterica serovar Typhimurium.

AgrB antisense RNA (arsR-gov region gene B) is transcribed opposite of dinQ (translates into a toxic single transmembrane peptide) with 30 complementary nucleotides. AgrB appears to repress accumulation of dinQ by RNA interference and counteracts its toxicity.

- Mycobacterium tuberculosis sRNA
- Pseudomonas sRNA
- Bacillus subtilis BSR sRNAs
- Caenorhabditis elegans sRNA
- Bacteroides thetaiotaomicron sRNA
- List of RNA structure prediction software
