= Caenorhabditis elegans small RNAs =

Small RNAs (sRNAs) have been identified within the C. elegans genome and comparative genomics has shown that they are conserved across several nematode species. These sRNAs contain a characteristic 2,2,7-trimethylguanosine (TMG) cap structure that identifies them as non-coding RNAs that have a functional role within the cell but at present the exact function of these sRNAs is unknown. Immunoprecipitation using antibodies against TMG and RNA microarrays were used to identify these sRNA.

== Examples ==
- sbRNA
- SmY RNA

== See also ==
- Bacillus subtilis sRNA
- Escherichia coli sRNA
- Mycobacterium tuberculosis sRNA
