= Yfr1 =

Cyanobacterial functional RNA

Cyanobacterial functional RNA 1
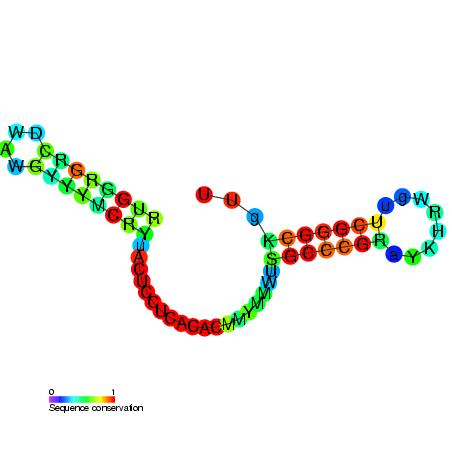
- Predicted secondary structure and sequence conservation of Yfr1

Identifiers
- Symbol: Yfr1
- Rfam: RF01116

Other data
- RNA type: Gene; sRNA
- Domain: Bacteria
- SO: SO:0001263
- PDB structures: PDBe

Yfr1 is a cyanobacterial functional RNA that was identified by a comparative genome based screen for RNAs in cyanobacteria. Further analysis has shown that the RNA is well conserved and highly expressed in cyanobacteria and is required for growth under several stress condition. Bioinformatics research combined with follow-up experiments have shown that Yfr1 inhibits the translation of the proteins PMM1119 and PMM1121 by an antisense interaction by base pairing at the ribosomal binding site.

== See also ==
- Yfr2 RNA
- Cyano-S1 RNA motif
- Cyano-2 RNA motif
