= Bacillus subtilis BSR sRNAs =

In a screen of the Bacillus subtilis genome for genes encoding ncRNAs, Saito et al. focused on 123 intergenic regions (IGRs) over 500 base pairs in length, the authors analyzed expression from these regions. Seven IGRs termed bsrC, bsrD, bsrE, bsrF, bsrG, bsrH and bsrI expressed RNAs smaller than 380 nt. All the small RNAs except BsrD RNA were expressed in transformed Escherichia coli cells harboring a plasmid with PCR-amplified IGRs of B. subtilis, indicating that their own promoters independently express small RNAs. Under non-stressed condition, depletion of the genes for the small RNAs did not affect growth. Although their functions are unknown, gene expression profiles at several time points showed that most of the genes except for bsrD were expressed during the vegetative phase (4–6 h), but undetectable during the stationary phase (8 h). Mapping the 5' ends of the 6 small RNAs revealed that the genes for BsrE, BsrF, BsrG, BsrH, and BsrI RNAs are preceded by a recognition site for RNA polymerase sigma factor σ^{A}.

== Type I Toxin/Antitoxin system ==
It was shown that bsrE, bsrG and bsrH pair through intermolecular interactions with newly identified antisense sRNAs. It was suggested that they form type I toxin/antitoxin system that includes an mRNA encoding for a short, toxic peptide (bsrE, bsrG and bsrH ) and an antitoxin that consists of an antisense RNA.

Further studies established that the 294-nucleotide bsrG encodes a 39-amino-acid toxin, and the 180 nucleotide antisense sRNA called SR4 acts as the antitoxin (they overlap by 123 nucleotides). SR4 interaction with the 3'UTR of bsrG RNA promotes bsrG degradation and inhibits its translation. BsrG interferes with cell envelope biosynthesis, causes membrane invaginations and delocalisation of the cell wall synthesis and initiates autolysis.

The 256 nucleotide bsrE RNA encodes 30 amino-acid toxin peptide. Its antitoxin gene, SR5 overlaps by 112 nucleotides at the 3' end of bsrE. The antitoxin SR5 promotes bsrE degradation but unlike SR4 it does not directly inhibits toxin mRNA translation.

== See also ==
- Bacterial small RNA
- Mycobacterium tuberculosis sRNA
- Caenorhabditis elegans small RNAs
- Escherichia coli sRNA
- Pseudomonas sRNA
- TxpA-RatA toxin-antitoxin system
- Bacillus subtilis type I antitoxin SR6
