= U50 =

U50 may refer to:

== Naval vessels ==
- German submarine U-50, various vessels
- HMS Rochester (U50), a sloop of the Royal Navy
- U-50-class submarine of the Austro-Hungarian Navy

== Other uses ==
- GE U50, a diesel-electric locomotive
- Small dodecicosahedron
- Small nucleolar RNA SNORD50
- U50 statistic, in computational biology
- Uppland Runic Inscription 50
