= MiR-206 =

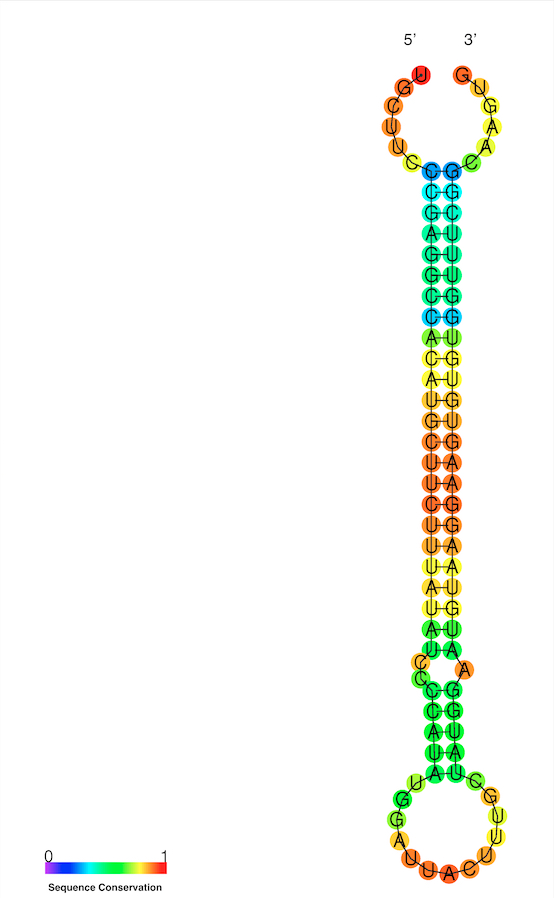
The structure of pre-miR-206 as determined by RNA folding algorithms

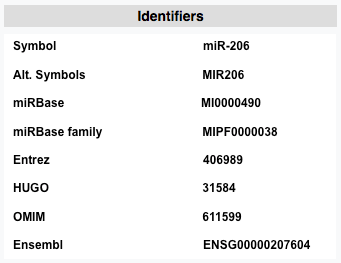
Identifiers for miR-206 sequence in various RNA and genomic databases

MiR-206 is a microRNA with a sequence conserved across most mammalian species, and in humans is a member of the myo-miR family of miRNAs, which includes miR-1, miR-133, and miR-208a/b. Mir-206 is well established for the regulation of cellular processes involving skeletal muscle development, as well as mitochondrial functioning. miR-206 is studied in C2C12 myoblast cells as this is a widely used model for the study of cellular differentiation of skeletal muscle. The biogenesis of miR-206 is unique in that the primary mature transcript is generated from the 3p arm of the precursor microRNA hairpin rather than the 5p arm. Currently, miR-206 has approximately twelve miRNA family members (six of which are shown in Table 1), and the cognate seed sequence (nucleotides 2-8) of the miR-206 family is conserved across all twelve miRNA members.

While miR-206 is tightly regulated during the embryonic development of skeletal muscle, miR-206 is also regulated by the nuclear steroid hormone receptor 17β-estradiol. Further evidence supporting the role of miR-206 in tumorigenesis originates from studies showing miR-206 is highly expressed in triple-negative breast tumors that grow independent of 17β-estradiol when compared to estrogen-receptor positive (ERα+), 17β-estradiol sensitive breast cancer cells. miR-206 is also an indicator of poorer overall survival rates in breast cancer patients. While miR-206 has a well defined role in breast tumor etiology, miR-206 was recently shown to control mesothelioma progression via the regulation of the Ras signaling pathway These studies add to an increasing body of literature showing how small noncoding regulatory RNAs maintain the normal cellular processes that prevent the tumorigenic process. A number of cell lines used to elucidate the role of miR-206 in breast cancer include MCF-7, MDA-MB-231, and MDA-MB-468 cell lines.

Single nucleotide polymorphisms (SNPs) can be located in the miRNA seed sequence, and therefore are known to have functional consequences. One such effect is the altered binding efficacy of a miRNA to the cognate mRNA target based on the altered single nucleotide composition of the miRNA seed region. In fact, a number of studies have indicated that the canonical seed sequence of a miRNA is not a sole determinate in miRNA:mRNA pairing interactions, as mutations of residues outside the seed region can also alter this binding efficacy. The miR-206 regulation of ERα through the direct binding of miR-206 in the ERα 3' UTR, is a good example of how a miRNA:mRNA base pairing interaction can be influenced by SNPs.

A number of additional miR-206 regulatory modules have been identified, such as the lncRNA HOTAIR mediated up-regulation of Bcl-w through sequestration of miR-206 which in turn enhances cellular proliferation in breast cancer cells. This study indicates miR-206 can interact with other non-coding RNAs to control a variety of tumorigenic process in a number of cancer systems. In support of this, SNHG14 can also sponge miR-206 thereby modulating the abundance of YWHAZ in cervical cancer. Together, these studies and the numerous studies not cited here due to space limitations, clearly show the therapeutic potential of a miRNA such as miR-206 in the oncological setting.

Outside the realm of tumor biology, miR-206 is of clinical interest due to the continued detection of this miRNA in samples from those with type 2 diabetes (TIID) and non-alcoholic fatty liver disease (NAFLD). In some studies the therapeutic delivery of miR-206 in a dietary obese mouse model resulted in reduced lipid and glucose production within the liver. The ability of miR-206 to facilitate insulin signaling and modulate lipogenesis indicates miR-206 may be a novel therapy for those with hyperglycemia. Mir-206 has also recently been identified as a biomarker for certain limb dystrophies, while circulating miR-206 levels are associative with preeclampsia.

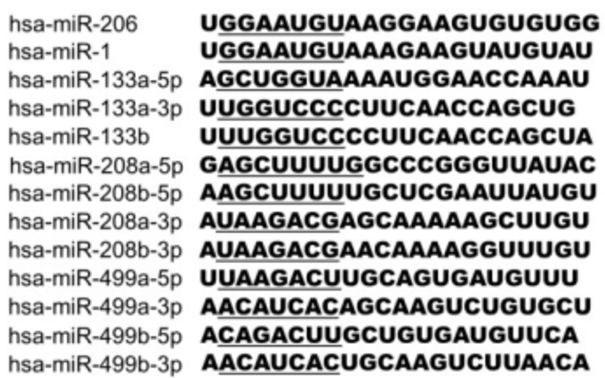
The conservation associated with miR-206 family members
