= LeuA-Halobacteria RNA motif =

leuA-Halobacteria
- Consensus secondary structure and sequence conservation of leuA-Halobacteria RNA

Identifiers
- Symbol: leuA-Halobacteria
- Rfam: RF03001

Other data
- RNA type: Cis-reg
- SO: SO:0005836
- PDB structures: PDBe

The leuA-Halobacteria RNA motif is a conserved RNA structure that was discovered by bioinformatics. leuA-Halobacteria motifs are found in Halobacteriaceae, a lineage of archaea.

leuA-Halobacteria motif RNAs likely function as cis-regulatory elements, in view of their positions upstream of protein-coding genes. Specifically they are upstream of genes encoding 2-isopropylmalate synthase and related genes, which participate in the synthesis of branched-chain amino acids. In bacteria, genes related to leucine are known to be regulated either by a short open reading frame known as the Leucine operon leader, or by T-boxes. In the leucine operon leader, a short ORF upstream of the regulated gene contains many leucine codons. When leucine levels are low, ribosomal stalling during the translation of these codons leads to a changed secondary structure that modifies gene expression. T-boxes measure cellular concentrations of leucine (or other amino acids) by binding uncharged leucine-tRNAs; low levels of leucine result in few tRNAs that are charged with leucine adducts. However, no specific evidence exists to suggest that leuA-Halobacteria motif RNAs function using these mechanisms. In addition, as of 2018, no mechanism is known for the regulation of leucine biosynthesis genes in archaea.
