= SR1 =

SR1, SR-1, SR.1 or Sr1 may refer to:

== Science and mathematics ==
- SR1 RNA, a small RNA produced by bacteria
- SR1, a candidate phylum of bacteria more commonly known as Absconditabacteria
- Symmetric rank-one, a mathematical algorithm

== Products and technology ==
- HDR-SR1, a Sony camcorder
- Peugeot SR1, a hybrid concept car
- Radical SR1, a sports car
- Vintage Ultralight SR-1 Hornet, an American homebuilt aircraft
- VR Class Sr1, a class of Finnish electric locomotives
- VSR SR-1 Snoshoo, an American Formula One racing aircraft design
- Six Chuter SR1, an American powered parachute design
- SR1, a FIA Sportscar Championship classification
- SR1, a 4-stroke Yamaha motorcycle
- SR.1, a semi-rigid airship built in 1918 for the British navy
- SR-1 Freedom, a nuclear-powered spacecraft proposed by NASA
- SR-1 Vektor, a Russian pistol

== Media ==
- Saints Row (2006 video game)
- Slime Rancher (2017 video game)
- SR1 Europawelle, a music station operated by Saarländischer Rundfunk (Saarland Broadcasting)

== Other ==
- Spelling Reform 1, an Australian English-language spelling reform proposal
- State Route or State Road 1; see List of highways numbered 1
