= MiR-208 =

miR-208
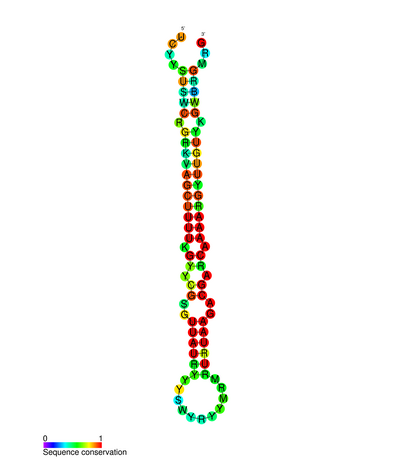
- Conserved secondary structure of miR-208 microRNA precursor

Identifiers
- Symbol: miR-208
- Alt. Symbols: MIR208
- Rfam: RF00749
- miRBase: MI0000251
- miRBase family: MIPF0000178
- NCBI Gene: 406990
- HGNC: 31585
- OMIM: 611116
- RefSeq: NR_029595

Other data
- RNA type: miRNA
- Domain(s): Metazoa
- GO: 0035195
- SO: 0001244
- Locus: Chr. 14 q11.2
- PDB structures: PDBe

miR-208 is a family of microRNA precursors found in animals, including humans. The ~22 nucleotide mature miRNA sequence is excised from the precursor hairpin by the enzyme Dicer. This sequence then associates with RISC which effects RNA interference.

In humans, the gene for miR-208 is located in an intron of MYH7.

== Function ==
miR-208 has been deemed a "myomiR" as it is specifically expressed, or found at much higher levels, in cardiac tissue. Other myomiRs include miR-1 and miR-133. miR-208 is thought to be dysregulated in various cardiovascular diseases.

miR-208 functions in cardiomyocytes regulating the production of the myosin heavy chain during development. It also responds to stress and forms part of a hormonal signalling cascade in cardiac cells.

== Applications ==
A preliminary study has shown a potential use in the prognosis of dilated cardiomyopathy. Another application has been suggested as using plasma concentration of miR-208 as a biomarker of damaged cardiac muscle cells.
