= Suzanne Zukin =

American neuroscientist

- Education: Bryn Mawr College; Johns Hopkins School of Medicine
- Scientific career
- Fields: Neuroscience, Glutamate Receptors
- Academic advisors: Donald Hollis, Daniel E. Koshland Jr.

R. Suzanne Zukin was an American neuroscientist and a professor of neuroscience who directs a research lab as a F. M. Kirby Chair in Neural Repair and Protection and director of the Neuropsychopharmacology Center at Albert Einstein College of Medicine. Zukin's areas of research include neurodegenerative disorders, ischemia, epigenetics and autism and uses molecular biology approaches to research these disorders. Zukin has made seminal contributions to the understanding of NMDA and AMPA receptor function and activity.

== Early career ==
After receiving a bachelor's degree from Bryn Mawr College in 1970, Zukin started her path as a molecular biologist with an understanding of protein structure-function relationships while working on her doctoral dissertation with Donald P. Hollis at Johns Hopkins Medical School. She subsequently pursued postdoctoral work with Daniel E. Koshland Jr. at UC Berkeley where she investigated ligand binding and conformational changes in sensory receptors.

== Neuroscience career and research ==
In 1977 Suzanne Zukin joined the department of Biochemistry at Albert Einstein College of Medicine.

Currently, the lab is part of the Neuroscience department at Albert Einstein, where Zukin presides as Director of the Neurophsycopharmacology Center and F.M. Kirby Chair in Neural Repair and Protection.

Currently, the lab is pursuing the following research questions related to molecular mechanisms of dysregulation of gene expression of synaptic proteins:

Epigenetic control of synaptic proteins: The Zukin lab researches epigenetic mechanisms that underlie neuronal death in animal models of stroke. They investigate the role of the gene silencing transcription factor RE1-silencing transcription factor (REST) and REST-dependent epigenetic remodeling of genes encoding synaptic proteins. The lab also pursues REST mediated experience-tuning expression of NMDA receptors during development, demonstrating that maternal deprivation disrupts a REST mediated switch to mature NMDA receptor expression

Molecular pathways leading to aberrations in autism and fragile X syndrome: The Zukin lab aims to identify protein expression dysregulation that may result in the phenotypes observed in autism spectrum disorders. The lab has found that the downstream targets of mTORC2, Rho GTPase Rac1 and LIMK exhibit increased expression in a mouse model of autism. Elevated expression of proteins in this pathway are causally related to reduced activity of the actin depolymerizing factor Cofilin, a major determinant of dendritic spine morphology. Another marker of fragile X syndrome that the lab identified is an elevation of GluA2 (GluR2) mRNA as a result of increased CPEB3 protein expression. Elevated GluA2 mRNA increases the percent of AMPA receptors containing GluA2, thus potentially altering the transmission properties and excitation properties of neurons in the brains of individuals with autism spectrum disorders.

== Awards and honors ==
2009 McKnight Foundation Neuroscience of Brain Disorders Award

Simons Foundation Autism Research Initiative

F.M. Kirby Chair in Neural Repair and Protection

Director of the Neurophsycopharmacology Center at Albert Einstein College of Medicine

Standing member of the NIH Study Section on Neural Oxidative Metabolism and Death for the National Institute for Neurologic Disorders & Stroke

2014 Brain and Behavior Research Foundation Distinguished Investigator award for "REST-dependent epigenetic remodeling of NMDA receptors as a risk factor in schizophrenia."

== Publications ==
Zukin has published almost 200 papers in peer-reviewed scientific journals

=== Notable research articles ===
- Pyronneau, Alexander; He, Qionger; Hwang, Jee-Yeon; Porch, Morgan; Contractor, Anis; Zukin, R. Suzanne (7 November 2017). "Aberrant Rac1-cofilin signaling mediates defects in dendritic spines, synaptic function, and sensory perception in fragile X syndrome". Science Signaling. 10 (504) eaan0852. doi:10.1126/scisignal.aan0852. PMC 5988355. PMID 29114038.
- Rodenas-Ruano, Alma; Chávez, Andrés E; Cossio, Maria J; Castillo, Pablo E; Zukin, R Suzanne (9 September 2012). "REST-dependent epigenetic remodeling promotes the developmental switch in synaptic NMDA receptors". Nature Neuroscience. 15 (10): 1382–1390. doi:10.1038/nn.3214. PMC 3501125. PMID 22960932.
- Noh, Kyung-Min; Hwang, Jee-Yeon; Follenzi, Antonia; Athanasiadou, Rodoniki; Miyawaki, Takahiro; Greally, John M.; Bennett, Michael V. L.; Zukin, R. Suzanne (17 April 2012). "Repressor element-1 silencing transcription factor (REST)-dependent epigenetic remodeling is critical to ischemia-induced neuronal death". Proceedings of the National Academy of Sciences of the United States of America. 109 (16): E962–E971. doi:10.1073/pnas.1121568109. PMC 3341013. PMID 22371606.
- Udagawa, Tsuyoshi; Swanger, Sharon A.; Takeuchi, Koichi; Kim, Jong Heon; Nalavadi, Vijayalaxmi; Shin, Jihae; Lorenz, Lori J.; Zukin, R. Suzanne; Bassell, Gary J.; Richter, Joel D. (July 2012). "Bidirectional Control of mRNA Translation and Synaptic Plasticity by the Cytoplasmic Polyadenylation Complex". Molecular Cell. 47 (2): 253–266. doi:10.1016/j.molcel.2012.05.016. PMC 3408552. PMID 22727665.
- Skeberdis, V Arvydas; Chevaleyre, Vivien; Lau, C Geoffrey; Goldberg, Jesse H; Pettit, Diana L; Suadicani, Sylvia O; Lin, Ying; Bennett, Michael V L; Yuste, Rafael; Castillo, Pablo E; Zukin, R Suzanne (12 March 2006). "Protein kinase A regulates calcium permeability of NMDA receptors". Nature Neuroscience. 9 (4): 501–510. doi:10.1038/nn1664. PMID 16531999. S2CID 15848680.
- Lan, Jian-yu; Skeberdis, Vytenis A.; Jover, Teresa; Grooms, Sonja Y.; Lin, Ying; Araneda, Ricardo C.; Zheng, Xin; Bennett, Michael V. L.; Zukin, R. Suzanne (April 2001). "Protein kinase C modulates NMDA receptor trafficking and gating". Nature Neuroscience. 4 (4): 382–390. doi:10.1038/86028. PMID 11276228. S2CID 6539333.
