= Drosophila roX RNA =

Drosophila roX1 ncRNA
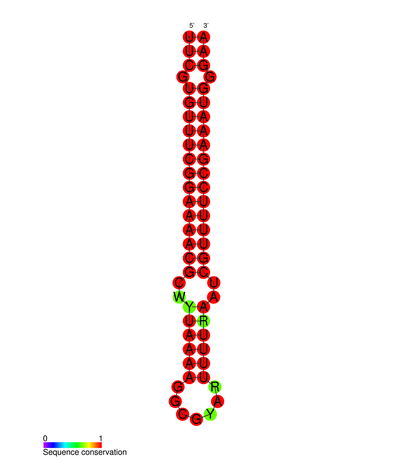
- Conserved secondary structure of roX1 RNA

Identifiers
- Symbol: roX1
- Rfam: RF01667

Other data
- RNA type: Cis-regulatory element
- Domain: Drosophila
- PDB structures: PDBe

RoX RNA is a non-coding RNA (ncRNA) present in the male-specific lethal (MSL) complex and is required for sex dosage compensation in Drosophila. As males only contain one X chromosome, male flies dosage compensate for the X chromosome by hyper-transcribing the X chromosome. This is achieved by the MSL complex binding to the X chromosome and inducing histone H4 lysine 16 acetylation and allows for the formation of euchromatin. These ncRNAs were first discovered in RNA extracted from neuronal cells.

Two roX RNAs have been identified in the MSL complex from Drosophila melanogaster and have been shown to be conserved across different Drosophila species. The two roX RNAs, known as roX1 and roX2 have been shown to differ in primary sequence and sequence length but despite these differences they both contain a MSL binding site and are functionally redundant. Cloning roX genes and subsequent sequence alignment from a number of different Drosophila species identified several conserved regions and it was also noticed that roX RNA is only present in male flies.

Secondary structure predictions predicted a stem loop to be present at the 3' end of the roX RNA transcripts. Mutagenesis within this region that either altered the sequence or prevented stem loop formation was shown to be lethal in male flies as they were unable to dosage compensate as these mutations prevented MSL binding to the X chromosome. It was also shown that in the presence of mutant roX RNA the MSL complex was unable to localize on the X chromosome and mislocalize to the heterochromatic chromocenter. This suggests that roX RNA plays a role in directing MSL complex to the X chromosome. Sequence alignment of roX2 identified several regions of sequence conservation known as Gub regions and are absent in roX1. Many of these Gub regions are thought to be redundant as mutating has no effect however, Gub1 which is present within the 3' stem loop region is thought to be a key motif required for roX2 as Gub1 mutations were shown to be lethal. These studies show that roX RNA are essential for dosage compensation where that the 3' stem loop region in the roX RNA are crucial for MSL localization and it is thought to be the motif that allows the two roX RNAs to be functionally redundant.

== See also ==
- Xist
