= Mir-16 microRNA precursor family =

Precursor microRNA family

mir-16
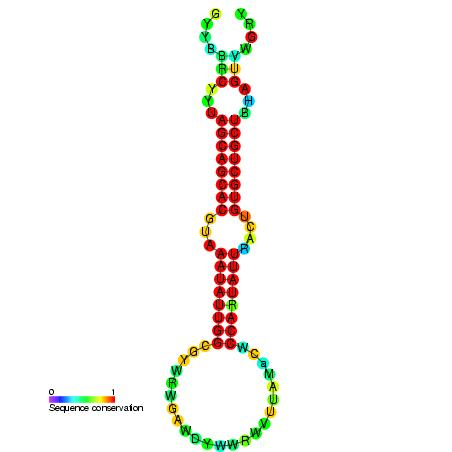
- miR-16 microRNA secondary structure and sequence conservation.

Identifiers
- Symbol: mir-16
- Rfam: RF00254
- miRBase family: MIPF0000006
- HGNC: 31545
- OMIM: 609704

Other data
- RNA type: microRNA
- Domain(s): Eukaryota;
- PDB structures: PDBe

The miR-16 microRNA precursor family is a group of related small non-coding RNA genes that regulates gene expression. miR-16, miR-15, mir-195 and miR-497 are related microRNA precursor sequences from the mir-15 gene family (). This microRNA family appears to be vertebrate specific and its members have been predicted or experimentally validated in a wide range of vertebrate species (MIPF0000006).

== Background ==
The human miR-16 precursor was discovered through detailed expression profile and Karyotype analyses of patients by Calin and colleagues. Karyotyping of chromosome structures from individuals with B-cell chronic lymphocytic leukaemias (B-CLL) found that more than half have alterations in the 13q14 region. Deletions of this well characterised 1 megabase region of the genome was also observed in approximately 50% of mantle cell lymphoma, up to 40% of multiple myeloma, and 60% of prostate cancers. Comprehensive screenings of the region at the time did not provide consistent evidence of involvement from any of the known genes at the time. Using CD5+ B-lymphocytes, which is known to accumulate with B-CLL progression, the minimal region lost from 13q14 region was scrutinised for regulatory elements. Publicly available sequence databases were used to identify a gene cluster which encodes the homologue to the human miR15 and miR16 from the Caenorhabditis elegans.

== Gene targets ==
In the original publication which identified the action of miR15 and miR16 in the development of B-CLL, Calin and colleagues proposed that miR16 could be the targets with imperfect base pairing for 14 genes. Increased CD5+ B-lymphocytes in CLL suggests the miR16 may be involved in cellular differentiation. In animal models single-stranded microRNA species act by binding to imperfect mRNA complements, typically to the 3' UTR, although targets have also been observed in the coding sequence of the mRNA. Downregulation of miR16 (as well as miR15) was observed in diffuse large B-cell lymphoma. miR16 has been shown to bind to a nine base pair to a complementary sequence in the 3' UTR region of BCL2, which is an anti-apoptotic gene involved in an evolutionarily conserved pathway in programmed cell death. In the nasopharyngeal carcinoma cell line, miR-16 has been shown to target the 3' UTR of vascular endothelial growth factor (VEGF) and repress the expression of VEGF, which is an important angiogenic factor.

== Clinical relevance ==
Altered expression of microRNA-16 has been observed in cancer, including malignancies of the breast, colon, brain , lung, lymphatic system, ovaries, pancreas , prostate and stomach. This difference in expression levels can be used distinguish between cancerous and healthy tissues and to determine clinical prognosis. The fact that pathology is associated with a different expression profile has led to the proposal that disease specific biomarkers can provide potential targets for directed clinical intervention. More recently, there is evidence that in colorectal cancer that the efficacy of treatment with the monoclonal antibody cetuximab can be assessed by the expression pattern of colorectal carcinoma after therapy.

miR-16 and miR-15a are clustered within a 0.5 kbp region in Chromosome 13 (13q14) in humans, a chromosomal region shown to be deleted or down-regulated in approximately more than half of B-CLL, the most prevalent form of leukemia in adults. Carcinogenesis is a gradual process, involving multiple genetic mutations, thus every patient with malignancy presents with a heterogeneous population of cells. The fact that mir-16 microRNA loss is observed in a large proportion of cells indicates the change occurred early in cancer development and a target for therapeutic intervention.
