= Lactis-leu-phe leader RNA motif =

leu/phe leader RNA from Lactococcus lactis

Identifiers
- Symbol: leu-phe_leader
- Rfam: RF01743

Other data
- RNA type: Cis-reg; leader;
- Domain(s): Bacteria;
- SO: SO:0005836
- PDB structures: PDBe

Consensus secondary structure of lactis-leu/phe leader RNAs. This figure is adapted from a previous publication.

The leu/phe-leader RNA motif (also the lactis-leu/phe-leader motif) is a conserved RNA structure identified by bioinformatics. These RNAs function as peptide leaders. They contain a short open reading frame (ORF) that contains many codons for leucine or phenylalanine. Normally, expression of the downstream genes is suppressed. However, when cellular concentrations of the relevant amino acid is low, ribosome stalling leads to an alternate structure that enables downstream gene expression.

Leu/phe leaders of this structure are known only in the species Lactococcus lactis, and is essentially the same as a previously characterized leucine leader in the same species. Additional homologs were uncovered that contain phenylalanine codons instead of leucine codons, and are upstream of genes involved in the synthesis of phenylalanine, instead of leucine.
