= Attenuator (genetics) =

Regulatory mechanism

In genetics, attenuation is a regulatory mechanism for some bacterial operons that results in premature termination of transcription. The canonical example of attenuation used in many introductory genetics textbooks, is ribosome-mediated attenuation of the trp operon. Ribosome-mediated attenuation of the trp operon relies on the fact that, in bacteria, transcription and translation proceed simultaneously. Attenuation involves a provisional stop signal (attenuator), located in the DNA segment that corresponds to the leader sequence of mRNA. During attenuation, the ribosome becomes stalled (delayed) in the attenuator region in the mRNA leader. Depending on the metabolic conditions, the attenuator either stops transcription at that point or allows read-through to the structural gene part of the mRNA and synthesis of the appropriate protein.

Attenuation is a regulatory feature found throughout Archaea and Bacteria causing premature termination of transcription. Attenuators are 5'-cis acting regulatory regions which fold into one of two alternative RNA structures which determine the success of transcription. The folding is modulated by a sensing mechanism producing either a Rho-independent terminator, resulting in interrupted transcription and a non-functional RNA product; or an anti-terminator structure, resulting in a functional RNA transcript. There are now many equivalent examples where the translation, not transcription, is terminated by sequestering the Shine-Dalgarno sequence (ribosomal binding site) in a hairpin-loop structure. While not meeting the previous definition of (transcriptional) attenuation, these are now considered to be variants of the same phenomena and are included in this article. Attenuation is an ancient regulatory system, prevalent in many bacterial species providing fast and sensitive regulation of gene operons and is commonly used to repress genes in the presence of their own product (or a downstream metabolite).

== Classes of attenuators ==
Attenuators may be classified according to the type of molecule which induces the change in RNA structure. It is likely that transcription-attenuation mechanisms developed early, perhaps prior to the archaea/bacteria separation and have since evolved to use a number of different sensing molecules (the tryptophan biosynthetic operon has been found to use three different mechanisms in different organisms.)

=== Ribosome-mediated attenuation ===
In this situation RNA polymerase is dependent on (lagging) ribosome activity; if the ribosome pauses due to insufficient charged tRNA then the anti-terminator structure is favoured. The canonical attenuator example of the trp operon uses this mechanism in E. coli. Similar regulatory mechanisms have been found in many amino acid biosynthetic operons.

=== Small-molecule-mediated attenuation (riboswitches) ===
Riboswitch sequences (in the mRNA leader transcript) bind molecules such as amino acids, nucleotides, sugars, vitamins, metal ions and other small ligands which cause a conformational change in the mRNA. Most of these attenuators are inhibitory and are employed by genes for biosynthetic enzymes or transporters whose expression is inversely related to the concentration of their corresponding metabolites. Example- Cobalamine biosynthesis, Cyclic AMP-GMP switch, lysin biosynthesis, glycine biosynthesis, fluroide switch etc.

=== T-boxes ===
These elements are bound by specific uncharged tRNAs and modulate the expression of corresponding aminoacyl-tRNA synthetase operons. High levels of uncharged tRNA promote the anti-terminator sequence leading to increased concentrations of charged tRNA. These are considered by some to be a separate family of riboswitches but are significantly more complex than the previous class of attenuators.

=== Protein-mediated attenuation ===
Protein-RNA interactions may prevent or stabilize the formation of an anti-terminator structure. .. karima eric discovery

=== RNA thermometers ===
Temperature dependent loop formations introduce temperature-dependence in the expression of downstream operons. All such elements act in a translation-dependent manner by controlling the accessibility of the Shine-Dalgarno sequence, for example the expression of pathogenicity islands of some bacteria upon entry to a host. Recent data predict the existence of temperature-dependent alternative secondary structures (including Rho-independent terminators) upstream of cold shock proteins in E. coli.

== Discovery ==
Attenuation was first observed by Charles Yanofsky in the trp operon of E. coli. The first observation was linked to two separate scientific facts. Mutations which knocked out the trp R (repressor) gene still showed some regulation of the trp operon (these mutants were not fully induced/repressed by tryptophan). The total range of trp operon regulation is about 700 X (on/off). When the trp repressor was knocked out, one still got about 10 X regulation by the absence or presence of trp. When the sequence of the beginning of the trp operon was determined an unusual open reading frame (ORF) was seen immediately preceding the ORFs for the known structural genes for the tryptophan biosynthetic enzymes. The general structural information shown below was observed from the sequence of the trp operon.

First, Yanofsky observed that the ORF contained two tandem Trp codons and the protein had a Trp percent composition which was about 10X normal. Second, the mRNA in this region contained regions of dyad symmetry which would allow it to form two mutually exclusive secondary structures. One of the structures looked exactly like a rho-independent transcription termination signal. The other secondary structure, if formed, would prevent the formation of this secondary structure and thus the terminator. This other structure is called the "preemptor".

== The trp operon ==
Mechanism of transcriptional attenuation of the trp operon.

An example is the trp gene in bacteria. When there is a high level of tryptophan in the region, it is inefficient for the bacterium to synthesize more. When the RNA polymerase binds and transcribes the trp gene, the ribosome will start translating. (This differs from eukaryotic cells, where RNA must exit the nucleus before translation starts.) The attenuator sequence, which is located between the mRNA leader sequence (5' UTR) and trp operon gene sequence, contains four domains, where domain 3 can pair with domain 2 or domain 4.

The attenuator sequence at domain 1 contains instruction for peptide synthesis that requires tryptophans. A high level of tryptophan will permit ribosomes to translate the attenuator sequence domains 1 and 2, allowing domains 3 and 4 to form a hairpin structure, which results in termination of transcription of the trp operon. Since the protein coding genes are not transcribed due to rho independent termination, no tryptophan is synthesised.

In contrast, a low level of tryptophan means that the ribosome will stall at domain 1, causing the domains 2 and 3 to form a different hairpin loop structure that does not signal termination of transcription. Therefore, the rest of the operon will be transcribed and translated, so that tryptophan can be produced. Thus, domain 4 is an attenuator. Without domain 4, translation can continue regardless of the level of tryptophan. The attenuator sequence has its codons translated into a leader peptide, but is not part of the trp operon gene sequence. The attenuator allows more time for the attenuator sequence domains to form loop structures, but does not produce a protein that is used in later tryptophan synthesis.

Attenuation is a second mechanism of negative feedback in the trp operon. While the TrpR repressor decreases transcription by a factor of 70, attenuation can further decrease it by a factor of 10, thus allowing accumulated repression of about 700-fold. Attenuation is made possible by the fact that in prokaryotes (which have no nucleus), the ribosomes begin translating the mRNA while RNA polymerase is still transcribing the DNA sequence. This allows the process of translation to directly affect transcription of the operon.

At the beginning of the transcribed genes of the trp operon is a sequence of 140 nucleotides termed the leader transcript (trpL). This transcript includes four short sequences designated 1–4. Sequence 1 is partially complementary to sequence 2, which is partially complementary to sequence 3, which is partially complementary to sequence 4. Thus, three distinct secondary structures (hairpins) can form: 1–2, 2–3 or 3–4. The hybridization of strands 1 and 2 to form the 1–2 structure prevents the formation of the 2–3 structure, while the formation of 2-3 prevents the formation of 3–4. The 3–4 structure is a transcription termination sequence, once it forms RNA polymerase will disassociate from the DNA and transcription of the structural genes of the operon will not occur.

Part of the leader transcript codes for a short polypeptide of 14 amino acids, termed the leader peptide. This peptide contains two adjacent tryptophan residues, which is unusual, since tryptophan is a fairly uncommon amino acid (about one in a hundred residues in a typical E. coli protein is tryptophan). If the ribosome attempts to translate this peptide while tryptophan levels in the cell are low, it will stall at either of the two trp codons. While it is stalled, the ribosome physically shields sequence 1 of the transcript, thus preventing it from forming the 1-2 secondary structure. Sequence 2 is then free to hybridize with sequence 3 to form the 2-3 structure, which then prevents the formation of the 3-4 termination hairpin. RNA polymerase is free to continue transcribing the entire operon. If tryptophan levels in the cell are high, the ribosome will translate the entire leader peptide without interruption and will only stall during translation termination at the stop codon. At this point the ribosome physically shields both sequences 1 and 2. Sequences 3 and 4 are thus free to form the 3-4 structure which terminates transcription. The result is that the operon will be transcribed only when tryptophan is unavailable for the ribosome, while the trpL transcript is constitutively expressed.

To ensure that the ribosome binds and begins translation of the leader transcript immediately following its synthesis, a pause site exists in the trpL sequence. Upon reaching this site, RNA polymerase pauses transcription and apparently waits for translation to begin. This mechanism allows for synchronization of transcription and translation, a key element in attenuation.

A similar attenuation mechanism regulates the synthesis of histidine, phenylalanine and threonine.

== Mechanism in the trp operon ==
The proposed mechanism of how this mRNA secondary structure and the trp leader peptide could regulate transcription of the trp biosynthetic enzymes includes the following.

- RNAP initiates transcription of the trp promoter.
- RNAP pauses at about nucleotide 90 at a secondary structure (?the first one shown above?).
- Ribosomes engage this nascent mRNA and initiate translation of the leader peptide.
  - RNAP is then "released" from its pause and continues transcription.
- When RNAP reaches the region of the potential terminator, whether it continues or not is dependent on the position of the ribosome "trailing behind".
  - If the ribosome stalls at the tandem Trp codons, waiting for the appropriate tRNA, region 1 is sequestered within the ribosome and thus cannot base pair with region 2. This means that region 2 and 3 become based paired before region 4 can be transcribed. This forces region 4 when it is made to be single stranded, preventing the formation of the region 3/4 terminator structure. Transcription will then continue.
  - If the ribosome translates the leader peptide with no hesitation, it then covers a portion of region 2 preventing it from base pairing with region 3. Then when region 4 is transcribed, it forms a stem and loop with region 3 and transcription is terminated, generating a ca. 140 base transcript.
- This mechanism of control measures the amount of available, charged Trp-tRNA.

The location of ribosomes determines which alternate secondary structures form.

== Other operons controlled by attenuation ==
The discovery of this type of mechanism to control the expression of genes in a biosynthetic operon lead to its identification in a wide variety of such operons for which repressors had never been discovered. For example:

Operon	Leader peptide	Article
Histidine	MTRVQFKHHHHHHHPD stop	Histidine operon leader
Threonine	MKRISTTITTTITITTGNGAG stop	Threonine operon leader
Ilv (GEDA)	MTALLRVISLVVISVVVIIIPPCGAALGRGKA stop	
IlvB	MTTSMLNAKLLPTAPSAAVVVVRVVVVVGNAP stop	
Leucine	MSHIVRFTGLLLLNAFIVRGRPVGGIQH stop	Leucine operon leader/Lactis-leu-phe leader RNA motif
Phenylalanine	MKHIPFFFAFFFTFP stop	Lactis-leu-phe leader RNA motif

== Attenuation in eukaryotes ==
Although an attenuation mechanism that involves translation while transcription is ongoing, like to the mechanism for the trp operon (and some other amino acid biosynthetic operons), would not work in eukaryotes, there is evidence for attenuation in Eukaryotes. Research conducted on microRNA processing provides evidence of eukaryotic attenuation; after co-transcriptional endonucleolitical cleavage by Drosha 5'->3' exonuclease XRN2 may terminate further transcription by torpedo mechanism.
