= Quisinostat =

Chemical compound

Clinical data
- Other names: JNJ-26481585
- ATC code: None

Pharmacokinetic data
- Bioavailability: oral

Identifiers
- IUPAC name: N-Hydroxy-2-[4-({[(1-methyl-1H-indol-3-yl)methyl]amino}methyl)-1-piperidinyl]-5-pyrimidinecarboxamide
- CAS Number: 875320-29-9
- PubChem CID: 11538455
- ChemSpider: 9713236
- UNII: 9BJ85K1J8S
- KEGG: D10321
- ChEBI: CHEBI:94771
- CompTox Dashboard (EPA): DTXSID90236376

Chemical and physical data
- Formula: C_{21}H_{26}N_{6}O_{2}
- Molar mass: 394.479 g·mol^{−1}
- 3D model (JSmol): Interactive image
- SMILES: O=C(NO)c1cnc(nc1)N2CCC(CC2)CNCc4c3ccccc3n(c4)C
- InChI: InChI=1S/C21H26N6O2/c1-26-14-17(18-4-2-3-5-19(18)26)11-22-10-15-6-8-27(9-7-15)21-23-12-16(13-24-21)20(28)25-29/h2-5,12-15,22,29H,6-11H2,1H3,(H,25,28); Key:PAWIYAYFNXQGAP-UHFFFAOYSA-N

Quisinostat (USAN; development code JNJ-26481585) is an experimental drug candidate for the treatment of cancer. It is a "second generation" histone deacetylase inhibitor with antineoplastic activity. It is highly potent against class I and II HDACs.

== History ==
It was developed by Janssen Pharmaceuticals and licensed to NewVac LLC.

Preclinical studies show that quisinostat amplifies HDAC-repressed expression of E-cadherin, leading to a reversal of epithelial to mesenchymal transition in tumor cells.

== Clinical trials ==
Results of a phase I trials in patients with multiple myeloma in combination with bortezomib and dexamethasone were published in 2016.
