= BACE1-AS =

Non-coding RNA in the species Homo sapiens

Identifiers
- Aliases: BACE1-AS, BACE1 antisense RNA, BACE1-AS1, FJ573250, NCRNA00177
- External IDs: OMIM: 614263; GeneCards: BACE1-AS
Orthologs
Databases	NCBI: entry; OMA: entry
Species	Human	Mouse
Entrez	100379571	n/a
Ensembl	ENSG00000278768	n/a
UniProt	n a	n/a
RefSeq (mRNA)	n/a	n/a
RefSeq (protein)	n/a	n/a
Location (UCSC)	n/a	n/a
PubMed search		n/a
- Wikidata
View/Edit Human

BACE1-AS, also known as BACE1 antisense RNA (non-protein coding), is a human gene at 11q23.3 encoding a long noncoding RNA molecule. It is transcribed from the opposite strand to BACE1 and is upregulated in patients with Alzheimer's disease. BACE1-AS regulates the expression of BACE1 by increasing BACE1 mRNA stability and generating additional BACE1 through a post-transcriptional feed-forward mechanism. By the same mechanism it also raises concentrations of beta amyloid, the main constituent of senile plaques. BACE1-AS concentrations are elevated in subjects with Alzheimer's disease and in amyloid precursor protein transgenic mice.

Knocking down BACE1-AS reduces amyloid production and plaque deposition.
