= Histidine operon leader =

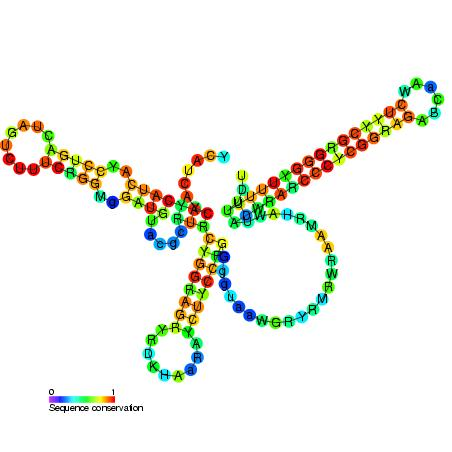
- Predicted secondary structure and sequence conservation of His_leader

Identifiers
- Symbol: His_leader
- Rfam: RF00514

Other data
- RNA type: Cis-reg; leader
- Domain(s): Bacteria
- SO: SO:0000233
- PDB structures: PDBe

The Histidine operon leader is an RNA element found in the bacterial histidine operon. At least 6 amino acid operons are known to be regulated by attenuation. In each a leader sequence of 150–200 bp is found upstream of the first gene in the operon. This leader sequence can assume two different secondary structures known as the terminator and the anti-terminator structure. In each case the leader also codes for very short peptide sequence that is rich in the end product amino acid of the operon. The terminator structure is recognised as a termination signal for RNA polymerase and the operon is not transcribed. This structure forms when the cell has an excess of the regulatory amino acid and ribosome movement over the leader transcript is not impeded. When there is a deficiency of the charged tRNA of the regulatory amino acid the ribosome translating the leader peptide stalls and the antiterminator structure can form. This allows RNA polymerase to transcribe the operon.
