= Mir-133 microRNA precursor family =

mir-133 microRNA precursor family
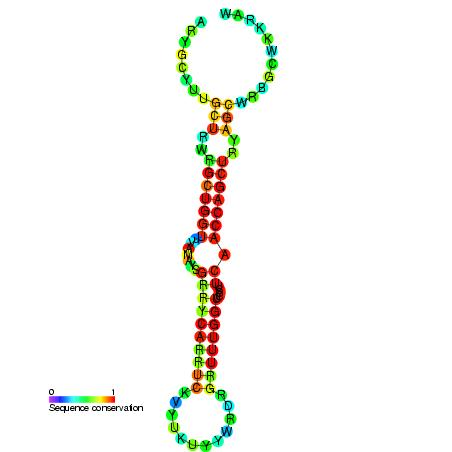
- Predicted secondary structure and sequence conservation of mir-133

Identifiers
- Symbol: mir-133
- Rfam: RF00446
- miRBase: MI0000450
- miRBase family: MIPF0000029

Other data
- RNA type: Gene; miRNA
- Domain: Eukaryota
- GO: GO:0035195 GO:0035068
- SO: SO:0001244
- PDB structures: PDBe

mir-133 is a type of non-coding RNA called a microRNA that was first experimentally characterised in mice. Homologues have since been discovered in several other species including invertebrates such as the fruitfly Drosophila melanogaster. Each species often encodes multiple microRNAs with identical or similar mature sequence. For example, in the human genome there are three known miR-133 genes: miR-133a-1, miR-133a-2 and miR-133b found on chromosomes 18, 20 and 6 respectively. The mature sequence is excised from the 3' arm of the hairpin. miR-133 is expressed in muscle tissue and appears to repress the expression of non-muscle genes.

== Regulation ==
It is proposed that Insulin activates the translocation of SREBP-1c (BHLH) active form from the endoplasmic reticulum (ER) to the nucleus and, concomitantly, induces SREPB-1c expression via PI3K signaling pathway. SREBP-1c mediates MEF2C downregulation through a mechanism that remains to be determined. As a consequence of lower MEF2C binding on their enhancer region, the transcription of miR-1 and miR-133a is reduced, leading to decreased levels of their mature forms in muscle, after insulin treatment. Altered activation of PI3K and SREBP-1c may explain the defective regulation of miR-1 and miR-133a expression in response to insulin in muscle of type 2 diabetic patients.

== Targets of miR-133 ==
Yin et al.. showed that the Mps1 kinase gene in zebrafish is a target. Boutz et al.. showed that nPTB (neuronal polypyrimidine tract-binding protein) is a target and likely contains two target sites for miR-133.

miR-133 directly and negatively regulates NFATc4.

RhoA expression is negatively regulated by miR-133a in bronchial smooth muscles (BSM)and miR-133a downregulation causes an upregulation of RhoA, resulting in an augmentation of contraction and BSM hyperresponsiveness.

BMP2 downregulates multiple mIRs, of which one, miR-133, directly inhibits Runx2, an early BMP response gene essential for bone formation. Although miR-133 is known to promote MEF-2-dependent myogenesis, it also inhibits Runx2-mediated osteogenesis. BMP2 controls bone cell determination by inducing miRNAs that target muscle genes but mainly by down-regulating multiple miRNAs that constitute an osteogenic program, thereby releasing from inhibition pathway components required for cell lineage commitment establish a mechanism for BMP morphogens to selectively induce a tissue-specific phenotype and suppress alternative lineages.

Nicotine activates α7-nAChR and downregulates the levels of miR-133 and miR-590 leading to significant upregulation of expression of TGF-β1 and TGF-βRII at the protein level establishing miR-133 and miR-590 as repressors of TGF-β1 and TGF-βRII.

miR-133 enhances myoblast proliferation by repressing serum response factor (SRF)

mIR-133 suppresses SP1 expression

In rats, miR-133b is expressed in retinal dopaminergicamacrine cell, and this expression is significantly increased during early stage during retinal degeneration. This overexpression leads to downregulation of the transcription factor PITX3. miR-133a is down regulated in diabetic cardiomyopathy.

miR-133 suppresses Prdm16 expression in skeletal muscle stem cells (satellite cells), which controls myogenic vs. brown adipogenic lineage determination in these cells.
