= SR1 RNA =

In molecular biology, the SR1 RNA is a small RNA (sRNA) produced by species of Bacillus and closely related bacteria. It is a dual-function RNA which acts both as a protein-coding RNA and as a regulatory sRNA.

SR1 RNA is involved in the regulation of arginine catabolism. SR1 RNA binds to complementary stretches of ahrC mRNA (also known as argR and inhibits translation. AhrC endodes an arginine repressor protein which represses synthesis of arginine biosynthetic enzymes and activates arginine catabolic enzymes via regulation of the rocABC and rocDEF operons.

In addition to acting as a sRNA, SR1 also encodes a small peptide, SR1P. SR1P binds to glyceraldehyde-3-phosphate dehydrogenase (GapA) and stabilises the gapA operon mRNAs.

SR1 expression is regulated by CcpA and CcpN.

== See also ==
- Bacterial small RNA
