= Tryptophan operon leader =

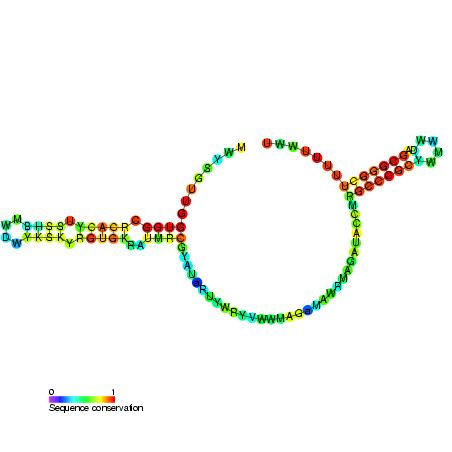
- Predicted secondary structure and sequence conservation of Trp_leader

Identifiers
- Symbol: Trp_leader
- Rfam: RF00513

Other data
- RNA type: Cis-reg; leader
- Domain(s): Bacteria
- SO: SO:0000233
- PDB structures: PDBe

The Tryptophan operon leader is an RNA element found at the 5′ of some bacterial tryptophan operons. The leader sequence can form two different structures known as the terminator and the anti-terminator, based on the Tryptophan amounts in the cell. The leader also codes for very short peptide sequence that is rich in tryptophan. The terminator structure is recognised as a termination signal for RNA polymerase and the operon is not transcribed. This structure forms when the cell has an excess of tryptophan and ribosome movement over the leader transcript is not impeded. When there is a deficiency of the charged tryptophanyl tRNA the ribosome translating the leader peptide stalls and the antiterminator structure can form. This allows RNA polymerase to transcribe the operon.

At least 6 different amino acid operons are known to be regulated by this attenuation.

== Trp RNA-binding attenuation protein ==
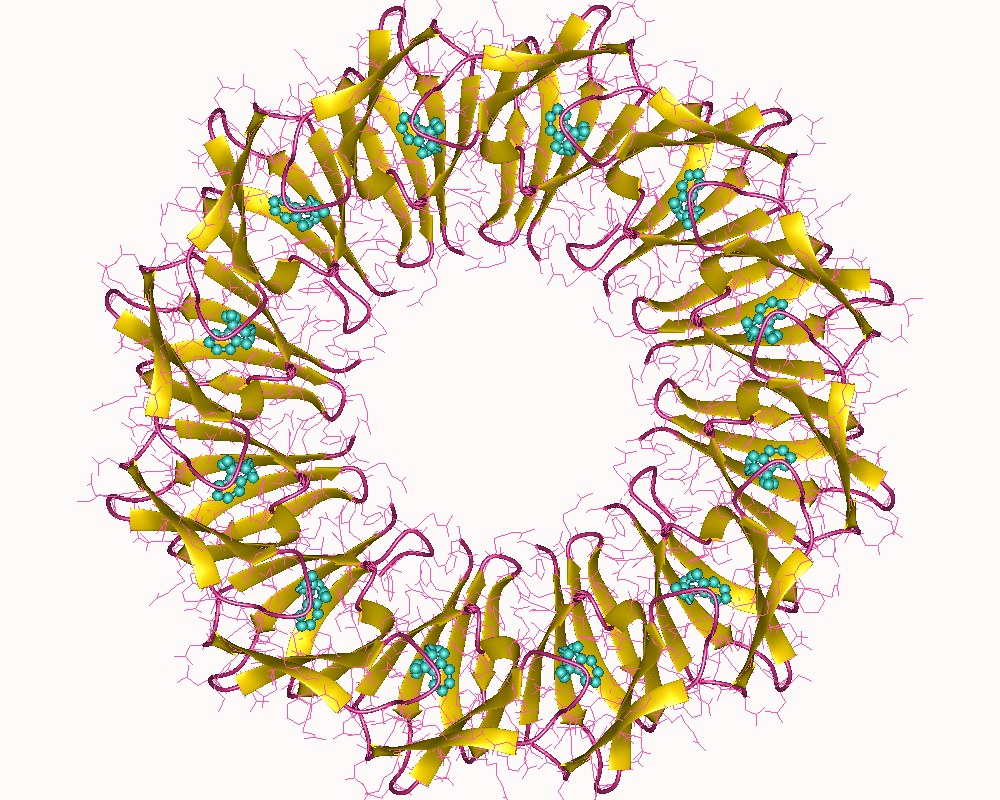
TRAP 3 dodekamer, Geobacillus stearothermophilus.

The formation of the terminator requires the trp RNA-binding attenuation protein (TRAP protein) in species of Bacillus and related bacteria. This protein is encoded by the MtrB gene. TRAP protein forms an oligomer of 11 subunits, in the presence of tryptophan this binds to section of RNA containing 11 (G/U)AG repeats. This sequence overlaps the anti-terminator loop, thus TRAP-binding preventing formation of the anti-terminator loop. When TRAP is bound the terminator loop forms and the operon is not transcribed.

== Tryptophan RNA-binding attenuator protein inhibitory protein ==
Tryptophan RNA-binding attenuator protein inhibitory protein (Anti-TRAP protein or AT) is a short protein encoded by the rtpA in Bacillus. Synthesis of anti-TRAP is induced by uncharged tryptophan tRNA. Anti-TRAP binds to TRAP and inhibits its binding to the tryptophan operator leader. This causes the anti-terminator loop to form and the tryptophan operon to be transcribed.
