= Small nucleolar RNA SNORD50 =

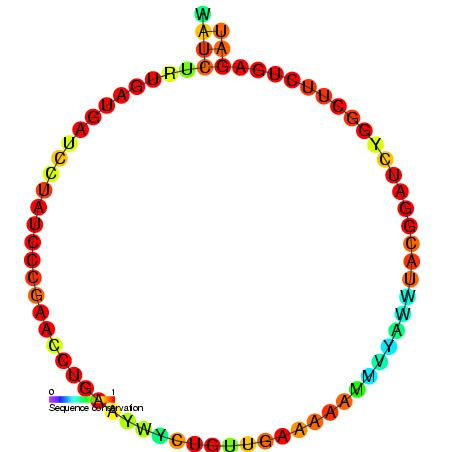
- Predicted secondary structure and sequence conservation of SNORD50

Identifiers
- Symbol: SNORD50
- Alt. Symbols: U50
- Rfam: RF00278

Other data
- RNA type: Gene; snRNA; snoRNA; CD-box
- Domain: Eukaryota
- GO: GO:0006396 GO:0005730
- SO: SO:0000593
- PDB structures: PDBe

In molecular biology, snoRNA U50 (also known as SNORD50) is a non-coding RNA (ncRNA) molecule which functions in the modification of other small nuclear RNAs (snRNAs). This type of modifying RNA is usually in the nucleolus of the eukaryotic cell which is a major site of snRNA biogenesis. It is known as a small nucleolar RNA (snoRNA) and also often referred to as a guide RNA.

snoRNA U50 belongs to the C/D box class of snoRNAs which contain the conserved sequence motifs known as the C box (UGAUGA) and the D box (CUGA). Most of the members of the box C/D family function in directing site-specific 2'-O-methylation of substrate RNAs.

U50 is an intronic snoRNA gene located on chromosome 6q15, at the breakpoint of chromosomal translocation t(3;6)(q27;q15). The U50HG gene is composed of six exons, whose spliced transcripts have little potential for coding a protein, and its introns produce both U50 and U50-like (U50') snoRNAs that are localised in nucleoli. There is evidence that the U50 paralogues form a novel family of genes controlling oncogenesis and sensitivity to therapy in cancer.
