= Arginine repressor ArgR =

Arginine repressor, C-terminal domain
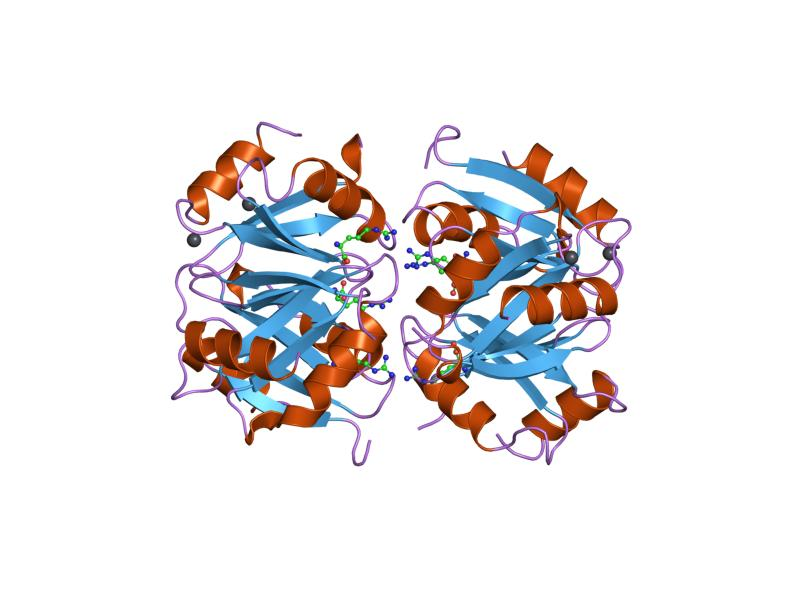
- c-terminal domain of escherichia coli arginine repressor/ l-arginine complex; pb derivative

Identifiers
- Symbol: Arg_repressor_C
- Pfam: PF02863
- InterPro: IPR020899
- SCOP2: 1aoy / SCOPe / SUPFAM
Available protein structures:
- PDB: IPR020899 PF02863 (ECOD; PDBsum)
- AlphaFold: IPR020899; PF02863

Arginine repressor, DNA binding domain

Identifiers
- Symbol: Arg_repressor
- Pfam: PF01316
- SCOP2: 1aoy / SCOPe / SUPFAM
Available protein structures:
- PDB: PF01316 (ECOD; PDBsum)
- AlphaFold: PF01316

In molecular biology, the arginine repressor (ArgR) is a repressor of prokaryotic arginine deiminase pathways.

The arginine dihydrolase (AD) pathway is found in many prokaryotes and some eukaryotes, an example of the latter being Giardia lamblia (Giardia intestinalis). The three-enzyme anaerobic pathway breaks down L-arginine to form 1 mol of ATP, carbon dioxide and ammonia. In some bacteria, the first enzyme, arginine deiminase, can account for up to 10% of total cell protein.

Most prokaryotic arginine deiminase pathways are under the control of a repressor gene, termed ArgR. This is a negative regulator, and will only release the arginine deiminase operon for expression in the presence of arginine. The crystal structure of apo-ArgR from Bacillus stearothermophilus has been determined to 2.5A by means of X-ray crystallography. The protein exists as a hexamer of identical subunits, and is shown to have six DNA-binding domains, clustered around a central oligomeric core when bound to arginine. It predominantly interacts with A.T residues in ARG boxes. This hexameric protein binds DNA at its N terminus to repress arginine biosynthesis or activate arginine catabolism. Some species have several ArgR paralogs. In a neighbour-joining tree, some of these paralogous sequences show long branches and differ significantly from the well-conserved C-terminal region.
