= Mir-1 microRNA precursor family =

Type of RNA

miR-1
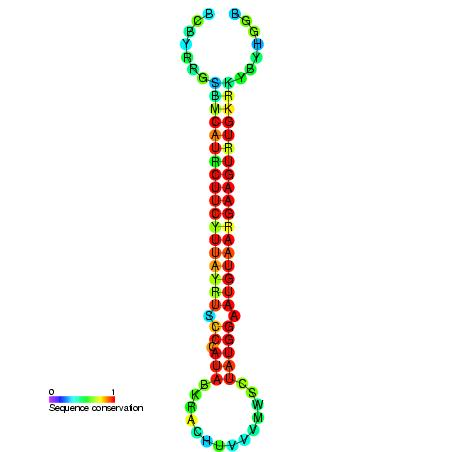
- mIR-1 microRNA precursor family

Identifiers
- Symbol: mir-1
- Rfam: RF00103
- miRBase: MI0000651
- miRBase family: MIPF0000038
- NCBI Gene: 406904
- HGNC: HGNC:31499
- OMIM: 609326

Other data
- RNA type: Gene; miRNA;
- Domain: Metazoa
- GO: 0035195
- SO: 0001244
- Locus: Chr. 20 q13.33
- PDB structures: PDBe

The miR-1 microRNA precursor is a small micro RNA that regulates its target protein's expression in the cell. microRNAs are transcribed as ~70 nucleotide precursors and subsequently processed by the Dicer enzyme to give products at ~22 nucleotides. In this case the mature sequence comes from the 3' arm of the precursor. The mature products are thought to have regulatory roles through complementarity to mRNA. In humans there are two distinct microRNAs that share an identical mature sequence, and these are called miR-1-1 and miR-1-2.

These micro RNAs have pivotal roles in development and physiology of muscle tissues including the heart. MiR-1 is known to play an important role in heart diseases such as hypertrophy, myocardial infarction, and arrhythmias. Studies have shown that MiR-1 is an important regulator of heart adaption after ischemia or ischaemic stress and it is upregulated in the remote myocardium of patients with myocardial infarction. Also MiR-1 is downregulated in myocardial infarcted tissue compared to healthy heart tissue. Plasma levels of MiR-1 can be used as a sensitive biomarker for myocardial infarction.

== Targets of miR-1 ==
The heat shock protein, HSP60 is also known to be a target for post-transcriptional regulation by miR-1 and miR-206. HSP60 is a component of the defence mechanism against diabetic myocardial injury and its level is reduced in the diabetic myocardium. In both in vivo and in vitro experiments increased levels of glucose in myocardiomyctes led to significant upregulation of miR-1 and miR-206 with resulting modulation of HSP60 leading to accelerated glucose-mediated apoptosis in cardiomyocytes.

MiR-1 has key roles in the development and differentiation of smooth and skeletal muscles. For example, in the lineage-specific differentiation of smooth muscle cells from embryonic stem cell derived cultures, MiR-1 is required; as its loss of function resulted in a reduction in smooth muscle cell biomarkers and a reduction in the derived smooth muscle cell population. There is evidence that the control of smooth muscle cell differentiation by MiR-1 may be mediated by the down regulation of Kruppel-like factor 4 (KLF4), since a MiR-1 recognition site is predicted in the 3' UTR of KLF4 and inhibition of MiR-1 results in reversed down-regulation of KLF4 and an inhibition of smooth muscle cell differentiation. A mutation in the 3' UTR of the myostatin gene in Texel sheep creates a miR-1 and miR-206 target site. This is likely to cause the muscular phenotype of this breed of sheep.

== Clinical relevance of miR-1 ==
Mir-1 plays an important role in some cancers. Rhabdomyosarcoma is the most common soft tissue sarcoma in children. Since the tumor results from undifferentiated cells, agents that promote differentiation hold promise as possible therapies. A study showed that levels of mir-1 and mir-133a were drastically reduced in tumourous cell lines whilst their targets were up-regulated.

Introduction of miR-1 and miR-133a into an embryonal rhabdomyosarcoma-derived cell line is cytostatic, which suggested a strong tumour-suppressive role for these microRNAs. Expression of miR-1 but not miR-133a gave transcriptional profiles that were consistent with a strong promyogenic influence on the cells, again demonstrating the role of miR-1 in muscle differentiation from precursor stem cells. The authors propose that miR-1 and miR-133a act to repress isoforms of genes that are not normally expressed in muscle cells. All of these observations suggest that mis-regulation of miR-1 and miR-133a can result in tumorogenesis via abolition of the suppressive effect they have on certain gene targets and of the removal of the promotion of differentiation of the cells exerted my miR-1.

The involvement of miR-1 in cancer is not limited to cancers of muscle and muscle tissues. MiR-1 may have a tumour-suppressive effect in bladder cancer by regulation of LIM and SH3 protein 1 (LASP1) .

There is evidence for the role of miR-1-2 as a modulator in acute myeloid leukemia via its transcription by the zinc-finger transcription factor, EVI1, ectopic virus expression site 1. ChIP assays have shown that EVI1 binds strongly to the promoters of miR-1-2 and miR-133-a-1, and expression of EVI1 is significantly correlated with the expression of miR-1-2 and miR-133-a-1 in established cell lines and in patient samples. However, only miR-1-2 was involved in abnormal proliferation in EVI1 expressing cell lines.

miR-1 and related microRNA miR-499 are proposed to be involved in the regulation of hepatocellular carcinoma (HCC) pathogenesis. These two microRNAs have been shown to downregulate the expression of the ets1 proto-oncogene in cell lines HepG2 by targeting the 3'UTR of ets1. ets1 is involved in extracellular matrix (ECM) degradation which is an important process required for tumor cell invasion and migration.
