= Leucine operon leader =

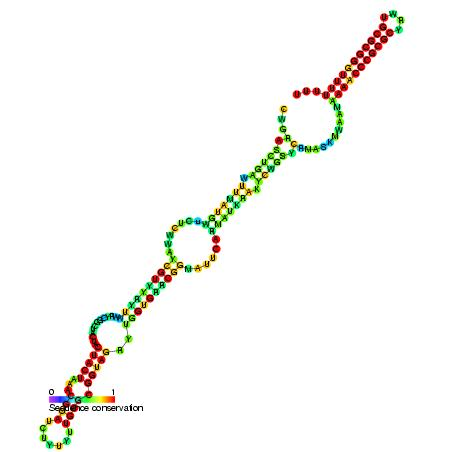
- Predicted secondary structure and sequence conservation of Leu_leader

Identifiers
- Symbol: Leu_leader
- Rfam: RF00512

Other data
- RNA type: Cis-reg; leader
- Domain(s): Bacteria
- SO: SO:0000233
- PDB structures: PDBe

The Leucine operon leader is an RNA element found upstream of the first gene in the Leucine biosynthetic operon. The leader sequence can assume two different secondary structures known as the terminator and the anti-terminator structure. The leader also codes for very short peptide sequence that is rich in leucine amino acid. The terminator structure is recognised as a termination signal for RNA polymerase and the operon is not transcribed. This structure forms when the cell has an excess of leucine and ribosome movement over the leader transcript is not impeded. When there is a deficiency of the charged leucyl tRNA the ribosome translating the leader peptide stalls and the antiterminator structure can form. This allows RNA polymerase to transcribe the operon. At least 6 amino acid operons are known to be regulated by attenuation.
