= RprA RNA =

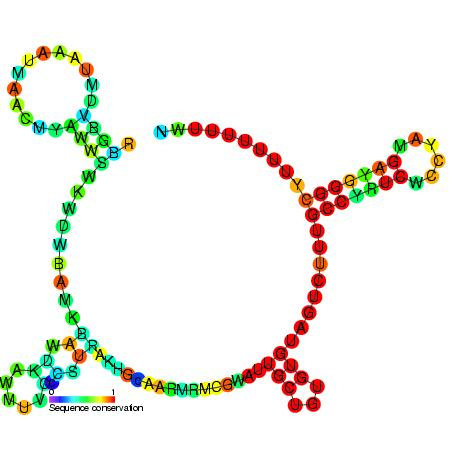
- Predicted secondary structure and sequence conservation of RprA

Identifiers
- Symbol: RprA
- Rfam: RF00034

Other data
- RNA type: Gene; sRNA
- Domain(s): Bacteria
- SO: SO:0000387
- PDB structures: PDBe

The RprA RNA gene encodes a 106 nucleotide regulatory non-coding RNA. Translational regulation of the stationary phase sigma factor RpoS is mediated by the formation of a double-stranded RNA stem-loop structure in the upstream region of the rpoS messenger RNA, occluding the translation initiation site.

Clones carrying rprA (RpoS regulator RNA A) increased the translation of RpoS. As with DsrA, RprA is predicted to form three stem-loops. Thus, at least two small RNAs, DsrA and RprA, participate in the positive regulation of RpoS translation. RprA also appears to bind to the RpoS leader. RprA is non-essential. Wasserman et al. demonstrated that this RNA is bound by the Hfq protein. Binding to Hfq alters the conformation of RprA. In the presence of Hfq the stability of RprA is influenced by the osmolarity of the cell, this is dependent on the endoribonuclease RNase E.

It has been shown the RprA regulates the protein coding genes, called csgD, this protein encodes a stationary phase-induced biofilm regulator and ydaM, which encodes a diguanylate cyclase involved in activating csgD transcription. These two target genes are repressed by RprA which results in regulation of biofilm formation.
