= Gisela Storz =

American microbiologist

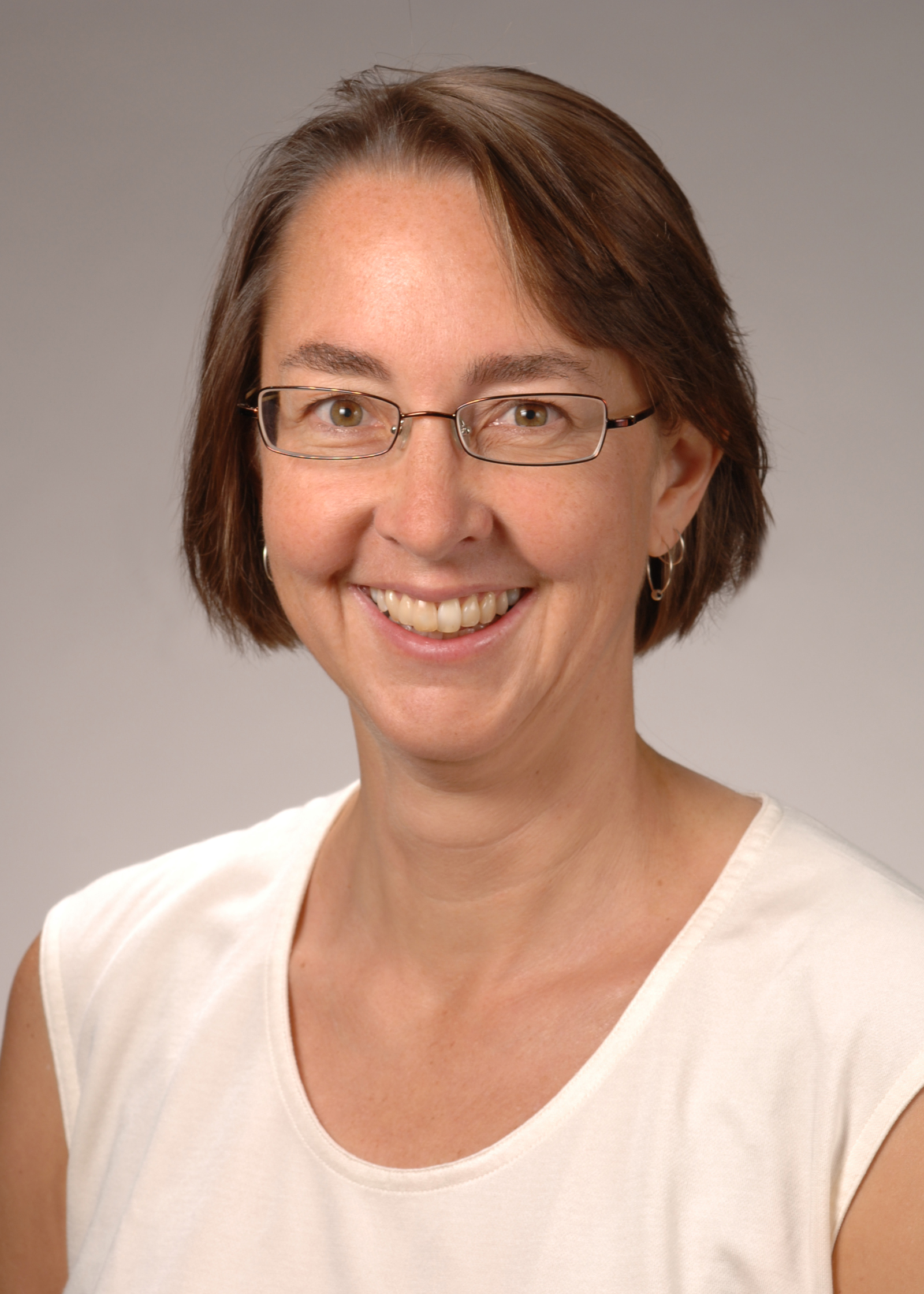
- Education: University of Colorado Boulder; University of California, Berkeley
- Known for: Oxidation response; Small RNA; Small protein
- Scientific career
- Fields: Genetics; Microbiology
- Workplaces: National Institutes of Health

Gisela Storz is a microbiologist at the Eunice Kennedy Shriver National Institute of Child Health and Human Development (NICHD) at the National Institutes of Health (NIH). She is the Associate Scientific Director of the Division of Molecular and Cellular Biology of NICHD. She is also a member of the National Academy of Sciences.

== Career ==
Gisela "Gigi" Storz received a B.A. in biochemistry in 1984 from University of Colorado Boulder. She completed her Ph.D. in biochemistry from University of California, Berkeley in the laboratory of Bruce Ames in 1988, where she discovered that OxyR senses hydrogen peroxide stress in Escherichia coli oxidation response. She trained briefly as a postdoctoral fellow at the National Cancer Institute with Sankar Adhya in 1989 and at Harvard Medical School with Frederick M. Ausubel from 1989 to 1991. She joined the National Institute of Child Health and Human Development at NIH in 1991 and is currently head of the Section on Environmental Gene Regulation. As of 2026, she became a co-editor of the Annual Review of Microbiology.

== Research ==
Storz's research interests include the characterization of small non-coding RNA and small proteins of 50 amino acids or less. An early focus of her research was the study of redox-sensitive transcription factors and the bacterial and yeast responses to oxidative stress. She discovered that the activity of the Escherichia coli transcription factor OxyR, now a paradigm for other redox-sensitive proteins, is regulated by reversible disulfide bond formation and elucidated how disulfide bond formation controls the nuclear localization of the Saccharomyces cerevisiae transcription factor Yap1. As a result of her group's serendipitous detection of the OxyS RNA, one of the first small regulatory RNAs to be discovered, attention shifted to the genome-wide identification and characterization of small regulatory RNAs in the model organism Escherichia coli. Work on small RNAs in Dr. Storz's lab revealed that the RNA chaperone Hfq stimulates the pairing of the majority of the small RNAs with mRNA targets and that small RNAs are integral to most regulatory circuits in bacteria. While identifying these small RNAs, her lab discovered that some of these small RNAs encode small proteins that had previously been overlooked because they are not detected in many traditional biochemical assays and the corresponding genes are poorly annotated. Her research group demonstrated that one such small protein, AcrZ, binds to the multidrug efflux pump protein AcrB to affect its ability to export certain classes of antibiotics. The Storz lab currently seeks to identify and to characterize the function of other small proteins from Escherichia coli.

== Awards and honors ==
- Elected to the American Academy of Microbiology in 2002.
- Received NIH Director’s Award in 2007 and 2014.
- Elected to the American Academy of Arts and Sciences in 2011.
- Elected to the National Academy of Sciences in 2012.
- Awarded Fellow of the American Association for the Advancement of Science in 2023.

== Selected publications ==
- Hao, Y.; Updegrove, T. B.; Livingston, N. N.; Storz, Gisela (2016-08-19). "Protection against deleterious nitrogen compounds: role of σS-dependent small RNAs encoded adjacent to sdiA". Nucleic Acids Research. 44 (14): 6935–6948. doi:10.1093/nar/gkw404. ISSN 1362-4962. PMC 5001591. PMID 27166377.
- Dambach, M., Sandoval, M., Updegrove, T. B., Anantharaman, V., Aravind, L., Waters, L. S. and Storz, G.(2015) The ubiquitous yybP-ykoY riboswitch is a manganese-responsive regulatory element. Mol. Cell 57, 1099-1109.
- Guo, M. S., Updegrove, T. B., Gogol, E. B., Shabalina, S. A., Gross, C. A. and Storz, G. (2014) MicL, a new sE-dependent sRNA, combates envelope stress by repressing synthesis of Lpp, the major outer membrane lipoprotein. Genes Dev. 28, 1620-1634.
- Hobbs, E. C., Yin, X., Paul, B. J., Astarita, J. L. and Storz, G. (2012) A conserved small protein associates with the AcrB efflux pump and differentially affects antibiotic resistance. Proc. Natl. Acad. Sci. USA 109, 16696-16701.
- Hemm, M. R., Paul, B. J., Schneider, T. D., Storz, G. and Rudd, K. E. (2008) Small membrane proteins found by comparative genomics and ribosome binding site models. Mol. Microbiol. 70, 1487-1501.
- Zhang, A., Wassarman, K. M., Rosenow, C., Tjaden, B. C., Storz, G., and Gottesman, S. (2003) Global analysis of small RNA and mRNA targets of Hfq. Mol. Microbiol. 50, 1111-1124.
- Wassarman, K. M. and Storz, G. (2000) 6S RNA regulates E. coli RNA polymerase activity. Cell 101, 613-623.
- Altuvia, S., Weinstein-Fischer, D., Zhang, A., Postow, L., and Storz, G. (1997) A small, stable RNA induced by oxidative stress: Role as a pleiotropic regulator and antimutator. Cell 90, 43-53.
- Zheng, M., Åslund, F., and Storz, G. (1998) Activation of the OxyR transcription factor by reversible disulfide bond formation. Science 279, 1718-1721.
- Storz, G., Tartaglia, L. A., and Ames, B. N. (1990) Transcriptional regulator of oxidative stress-inducible genes: Direct activation by oxidation. Science 248, 189-194.
