= Anti-sigma factors =

Antagonists of a youth's slang

== Introduction ==
Anti-sigma factors are small proteins that bind to sigma factors and inhibit transcriptional activity in regulating prokaryote gene expression. Anti-sigma factors have both a sigma-binding domain and a sensory/signaling domain; this allows them to respond to signals inside and outside the cell. Anti-sigma factors have been found in several bacteria, including Escherichia coli and Salmonella, and viruses such as the T4 bacteriophage. Anti-sigma factors have an antagonistic effect on sigma factors. Each sigma factor has an associated anti-sigma factor that regulates it. These anti-sigma factors are divided into cytoplasmic-bound anti-sigma factors and inner membrane-bound anti-sigma factors. The differences in these sigma factors are where in the cell they are bound. Cytoplasmic-bound anti-sigma factors include FlgM, DnaK, RssB, and HscC. Inner membrane-bound anti-sigma factors, also called extra-cytoplasmic function (ECF) anti-sigma factors, include FecR and RseA. ECF anti-sigma factors tend to be more diverse in genetic sequence than cytoplasmic-bound anti-sigma factors. These factors regulate many cellular processes, such as flagellum assembly, transport of materials, cell growth, and the cell's stress response.

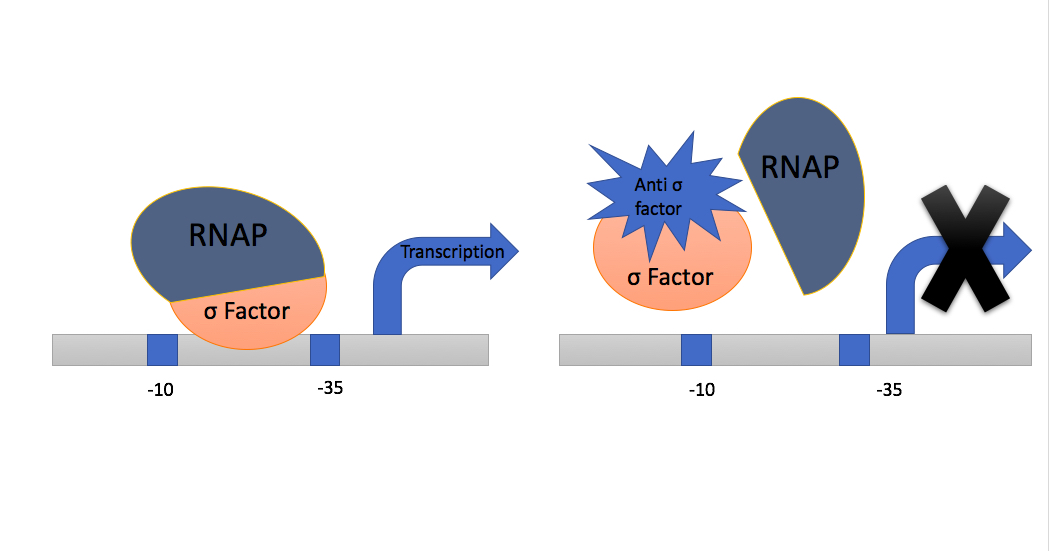
The left side of the picture shows sigma bound to an RNA polymerase (RNAP), ready to transcribe the gene ahead. On the right side of the picture, the anti-sigma factor binds to the sigma factor, kicking out RNAP and terminating transcription of the gene in front.

Sigma factors are essential proteins that start the transcription by binding with RNAP; anti-sigma factors are proteins that inhibit the activities of sigma factors affected by several mechanisms. These mechanisms include adding up the anti-sigma factor between sigma or twisting the anti-sigma factor around sigma—gene regulation, especially in bacteria, allows for adaptivity and normal cell differentiation and development. Gene regulation has many different layers of regulators. Yet, initiating transcription is crucial in controlling which genes are expressed.

Anti-sigma factors are simultaneously transcribed with their associated sigma factor. This pairing creates a negative feedback loop, maintaining proper levels of both contrasting factors as there can only be one anti-sigma factor per sigma factor that is transcribed.

Research shows anti-sigma factors have more activities than contouring sigma factors effects. Anti-sigma factors can also activate some cells while inhibiting others, meaning they have an essential role in cell function.

== Mechanism ==
There are three main categories for triggering the release of sigmas factors from anti-sigma factors: partner switching, direct signaling, and a mechanism regulated by proteolysis.

The partner-switching mechanism is commonly found in Gram-positive bacteria. It consists of four key players: a sigma factor, an anti-sigma factor, an anti-anti-sigma factor, and an input phosphatase complex. A cell that is not under stress has an anti-sigma factor that is bound to the sigma factor on the gene and keeps it inactive. In times of stress, a phosphatase complex dephosphorylates the anti-sigma factor, allowing the anti-sigma factor to switch partners and bind to the anti-anti-sigma factor. This frees the sigma factors to activate the gene. Environmental stressors, such as heat, often activate this mechanism.

The direct signaling mechanism is as it sounds: the anti-sigma factor binds to a signal, which causes conformation changes in the structure of the anti-sigma factors, resulting in the release of the sigma factors.

The regulated intramembrane proteolysis (RIP) mechanism allows signal transduction across membranes. This mechanism is often used to regulate ECF sigma factors. The mechanism involves two sequential cleavages, the first being an external cleavage of membrane-traversing anti-sigma factor and the second cleavage of the anti-sigma factors in the membrane's plane, resulting in a free cytoplasmic domain.

== Anti-sigma factors in Escherichia coli ==
E. coli has seven main sigma factors, five of which have a specific anti-sigma factor. The anti-sigma factor binding to its sigma factors depends upon environmental cues. This mechanism blocks the transcription of genes that are unnecessary in new conditions. The table below shows five sigma factors, what process it affects, and its corresponding anti-sigma factor. In E. coli, sigma factors transcribe their anti-sigma factors; this creates a negative feedback loop. The sigma factor can be regulated when the anti-sigma factor is transcribed and the anti-sigma factor when the sigmas gene is transcribed. Sigma factors 70 and 54 don't have specific anti-sigma factors; they have other negative feedback loop mechanisms.

Sigma factor	Sigma Effect	Related anti-sigma factor
σ^{38}	Master regulator of general stress response	RssB
σ^{32}	Heat shock response ≥ 37 °C	Dnak
σ^{28}	Active late gene of flagellum assembly	FIgM
σ^{24}	Signals release of factors to fix misfolded proteins	RseA
σ^{19}	One signal in the EC signaling pathway	FecR

== Anti-Anti-Sigma Factors ==
Anti-anti-sigma factors allow for the dissociation of the matching anti-sigma factor from its sigma factors, thought binding to the anti-sigma factor, forcing its release from the sigma factor. This allows for tighter regulation of the transcription of genes as a response to environmental conditions. Anti-anti-sigma factors can thereby function as negative or positive regulatory elements, depending on the corroding sigma factor and gene involved.

== In Bacteriophage ==
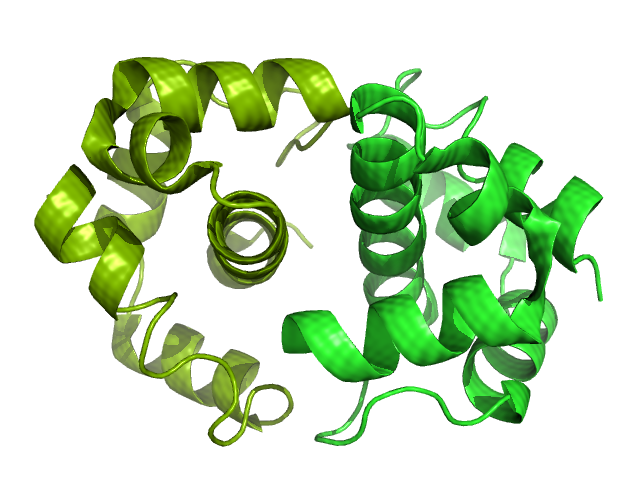
Cartoon representation of T4 anti-sigma factor Audrey Stevens' Inhibitor, PDB entry 1jr5

T4 bacteriophage uses anti-sigma factor to ruin the Escherichia coli polymerase in order that direct exclusive transcription of its own genes.

AsiA is an anti-sigma factor gene that is required for bacteriophage T4 to be developed). Which means that AsiA is an essential anti-sigma factor in bacteriophage.

== Sigma B Factor in Bacillus subtilis ==
Sigma B was the first anti-sigma factor identified in a bacterium. It is found in Bacillus subtilis and other similar bacteria. Sigma B is a stress response factor that plays a role in survival and against destruction that could be caused by other organisms such as mammals. General stress responses that are controlled by Sigma B are stimulated by things like temperature, salt concentration, energy depletion, etc. Once activated, Sigma B binds to the RNAP and recognizes a promoter, causing inhibition of the stimuli. Because Sigma B orthologs are conserved in various gram-positive bacteria, this anti-sigma factor plays an essential role in the evolution of different bacteria and their ability to respond to stressing factors. Scientist have found that the anti- sigma factor, Sigma B controls more than 150 genes that are influential in stress response.

== RsbW in Bacillus subtilis ==
When Bacillus subtilis is not under stress conditions, it is negatively regulated by the anti-sigma factor, Rsbw. RsbW is an anti-sigma factor that regulates another anti-sigma factor, sigma B. RsbW binds to sigma B and prevents it from forming an RNA polymerase holoenzyme. However, in stressed conditions, the unphosphorylated form of the protein, RsbV, competes with Sigma B for binding to RsbW. RsbV binds to RsbW, allowing sigma B to bind to the core RNA polymerase, resulting in the expression of stress response.
