= RpoS =

Gene

RNA polymerase sigma factor RpoS

Identifiers
- Organism: Escherichia coli (strain K12)
- Symbol: rpoS
- Alt. symbols: appR, katF, nur, otsX, sigS
- Entrez: 947210
- Orthologs: NCBI: entry; OMA: entry
- PDB: 5IPL, 5IPM, 5IPN, 6FI7, 6IDO, 6KJ6, 6UTV, 6UTW, 6UTX, 6UTY, 6UTZ, 6UU0, 6UU1, 6UU2, 6UU3, 6UU4, 6UU5, 6UU6, 6UU7, 6UU8, 6UU9, 6UUA, 6UUB, 6UUC
- RefSeq (mRNA): NC_000913
- RefSeq (Prot): NP_417221
- UniProt: P13445

Other data
- Chromosome: Genomic: 2.87 - 2.87 Mb
Search for
- Structures: Swiss-model
- Domains: InterPro

The gene rpoS (RNA polymerase, sigma S, also called katF) encodes the sigma factor sigma-38 (σ38, or RpoS), a 37.8 kD protein in Escherichia coli. Sigma factors are proteins that regulate transcription in bacteria. Sigma factors can be activated in response to different environmental conditions. rpoS is transcribed in late exponential phase, and RpoS is the primary regulator of stationary phase genes. RpoS is a central regulator of the general stress response and operates in both a retroactive and a proactive manner: it not only allows the cell to survive environmental challenges, but it also prepares the cell for subsequent stresses (cross-protection). The transcriptional regulator CsgD is central to biofilm formation, controlling the expression of the curli structural and export proteins, and the diguanylate cyclase, adrA, which indirectly activates cellulose production. The rpoS gene most likely originated in the gammaproteobacteria.

== Environmental signal to activation: regulation of RpoS ==
Regulatory mechanisms that control RpoS exist at various levels of gene and protein organization: transcription, translation, degradation, and protein activity. These processes occur in response to stresses such as near-UV radiation, acid, temperature or osmotic shock, oxidative stress, and nutrient deprivation. While many key regulatory entities have been identified in these areas, the precise mechanisms by which they signal rpoS transcription, translation, proteolysis or activity remain largely uncharacterized.

=== Transcriptional control of rpoS ===
Transcription of rpoS in E. coli is mainly regulated by the chromosomal rpoSp promoter. rpoSp promotes transcription of rpoS mRNA, and is induced upon entry into stationary phase in cells growing on rich media via an unknown mechanism. Flanking rpoSp are two putative cAMP-CRP (cyclic AMP-cAMP receptor protein) binding sites that seem to control rpoS transcription in an antagonistic manner. The position of the first site upstream of the major rpoS promoter corresponds to a “classical activator” similarly found in the lac promoter thereby suggesting that its effects on transcription are activating (Lange and Hengge-Aronis, 1994); in contrast, the location of the second cAMP-CRP site is indicative of inhibitory action. In exponential phase, crp mutants exhibit high levels of rpoS expression, suggesting that cAMP-CRP inhibits rpoS transcription. Upon entry into stationary phase, on the other hand, cAMP-CRP may upregulate rpoS transcription (Hengge-Aronis, 2002). While these observations may explain the seemingly dual nature of the cAMP-CRP binding sites, they require an explanation of phase-dependent selection of cAMP-CRP site activation to fully account for the contradictory data. Additional regulatory controls for rpoS transcription include: BarA, a Histidine sensor kinase which can activate OmpR and thereby promote porin synthesis; levels of small molecules such as ppGppp which may hinder transcriptional elongation or stability in response to amino acid limitation, or carbon, nitrogen or phosphorus starvation (Gentry et al., 1993). Despite the numerous controls on rpoS transcription, cellular rpoS mRNA levels remain high during exponential phase and the majority of extracellular stimuli do not significantly affect rpoS transcription.

=== Translational control of rpoS ===
Most RpoS expression is determined at the translational level. sRNAs (small noncoding RNAs) sense environmental changes and in turn increase rpoS mRNA translation to allow the cell to accordingly adjust to external stress. The promoter of the 85 nucleotide sRNA DsrA contains a temperature-sensitive transcription initiation thermocontrol as it is repressed at high (42˚C) temperatures, but induces (perhaps by complementary binding to) rpoS at low (25˚C) temperatures. Another sRNA, RprA, stimulates rpoS translation in response to cell surface stress signaled via the RcsC sensor kinase. A third type of sRNA, OxyS, is regulated by OxyR, the primary sensor of oxidative shock. The mechanism by which OxyS interferes with rpoS mRNA translational efficiency is not known. However, the RNA-binding protein Hfq is implicated in the process. Hfq binds to rpoS mRNA in vitro and may thereby modify rpoS mRNA structure for optimal translation. Hfq activates both DsrA and RprA. In contrast, LeuO inhibits rpoS translation by repressing dsrA expression and the histone-like protein HN-S (and its paralog StpA) inhibits rpoS translation via an unknown mechanism. In addition, H-NS, LeuO, Hfq and DsrA form an interconnected regulatory network that ultimately controls rpoS translation.

RpoS translation was also shown to be controlled in other bacterial species, beside Escherichia coli. E.g., in the opportunistic human pathogen Pseudomonas aeruginosa the sRNA ReaL translationally silences rpoS mRNA.

=== RpoS degradation ===
RpoS proteolysis forms another level of the sigma factor’s regulation. Degradation occurs via ClpXP, a barrel-shaped protease composed of two six-subunit rings of the ATP-dependent ClpX chaperone that surround two seven-subunit rings of ClpP (Repoila et al., 2003). The response regulator RssB has been identified as a σS-specific recognition factor crucial for RpoS degradation. Additional factors known to regulate RpoS proteolysis but via incompletely characterized mechanisms include: RssA which is found on the same operon as RssB; H-NS and DnaK, both of which also regulate rpoS mRNA translation, and LrhA; and acetyl phosphate affects RpoS proteolysis by possibly acting as a phosphoryl donor to RssB.

== The RpoS regulon ==
Consistent with its role as the master controller of the bacterial stress response, RpoS regulates the expression of stress-response genes that fall into various functional categories: stress resistance, cell morphology, metabolism, virulence and lysis.

=== Stress resistance ===
Many genes under RpoS control confer stress resistance to assaults such as DNA damage, presence of reactive oxygen species and osmotic shock. The product of xthA is an exonuclease that participates in DNA repair by recognizing and removing 5’ monophosphates near abasic sites in damaged DNA. Likewise, catalases HPI and HPII, encoded by katG and katE convert harmful hydrogen peroxide molecules to water and oxygen. The otsBA gene product trehalose functions as an osmoprotectant and is needed for desiccation resistance. Additional RpoS-dependent factors involved in oxidative stress include glutathione reductase (encoded by gor), and superoxide dismutase (encoded by sodC).

It has also been found, using comparative proteomic analysis with B. pseudomallei, that rpoS regulates eight oxidative responsive proteins including ScoA (a SCOT subunit) not previously known for oxidative stress response involvement. The regulatory effect in this case is RpoS down regulation of SCOT expression in response to oxidative stress in B. pseudomallei.

=== Morphology ===
RpoS-dependent genes involved in changes in cell membrane permeability and general cell morphology mostly belong to the osm family of genes. osmB encodes an outer membrane lipoprotein that may play a role in cell aggregation (Jung et al., 1990) , whereas osmY encodes a periplasmic protein. Additional RpoS-dependent factors that determine the size and shape of the cell include the morphogene bolA and products of the ftsQAZ operon that play a role in the timing of cell division. Control of cell shape, cell division and cell-cell interaction are likely to be important in inhibiting cell proliferation and thus allocating resources to cell survival during periods of stress.

=== Metabolism ===
Metabolically-optimal survival conditions include RpoS-dependent decreased Krebs cycle activity and increased glycolytic activity to limit the reactive oxygen species that are byproduced as a result of essential cellular processes. Pyruvate entry into the Krebs cycle is inhibited by the product of the RpoS-dependent gene poxB. An overall slowdown in metabolic activity is consistent with energy conservation and reduced growth during periods of stress.

=== Virulence ===
As a defense mechanism, the host environment is hostile to invading pathogens. Therefore, infection can be a stressful event for pathogenic bacteria and control of virulence genes may be temporally correlated with the timing of infection by pathogens. Discovery of RpoS-dependent virulence genes in Salmonella is consistent with RpoS as a general regulator of the stress response: the spv gene found on a virulence plasmid in this bacterium is controlled by RpoS and is required for growth in deep lymphoid tissue such as the spleen and liver.

=== Lysis ===
RpoS also plays an important role in regulating cell lysis. Along with OmpR, it upregulates the entericidin (ecnAB) locus which encodes a lysis-inducing toxin. In contrast, ssnA is negatively controlled by RpoS but it also promotes lysis. Paradoxically, lysis is seen as a survival process in certain contexts.
