= MicX sRNA =

MicX Vibrio cholerae sRNA
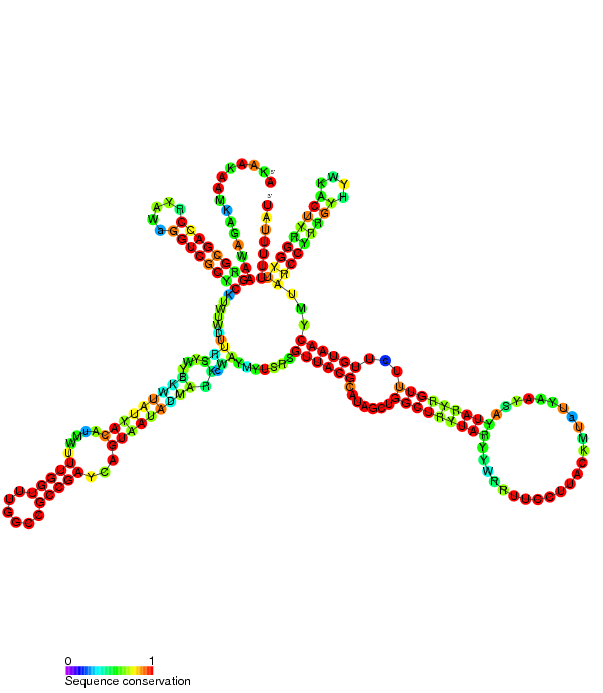
- Secondary structure of MicX sRNA.

Identifiers
- Symbol: MicX
- Rfam: RF01808

Other data
- RNA type: sRNA
- Domain: Vibrio cholerae
- PDB structures: PDBe

MicX sRNA (formerly known as A10) is a small non-coding RNA found in Vibrio cholerae. It was given the name MicX as it has a similar function to MicA, MicC and MicF in E. coli. MicX sRNA negatively regulates an outer membrane protein (coded for by VC0972) and also a component of an ABC transporter (gene VC0620). These interactions were predicted and then confirmed using a DNA microarray.

MicX was identified through a bioinformatics screen of V. cholerae having been previously predicted. Levels of transcription of this sRNA were compared under several conditions: it was found to be expressed on all tested mediums; richer mediums slightly reduced transcription; repression of certain sigma factors (δ^{S} and δ^{E}) did not change transcription but it was dramatically reduced in the absence of Hfq protein. This observation is in accordance with other sRNA expression patterns.

The MicX RNA gene overlaps with VCA0943 - a gene coding for a maltose transporter permease - but the ribonuclease RNAase E processes the MicX transcript to create an active and stable form containing only the VCA0943 3′ UTR.

== See also ==
- Hfq protein
