= Core enzyme =

Subunits of an enzyme that are needed for catalytic activity

A core enzyme consists of the subunits of an enzyme that are needed for catalytic activity, as in the core enzyme RNA polymerase.

An example of a core enzyme is a RNA polymerase enzyme without the sigma factor (σ). This enzyme consists of only two alpha (2α), one beta (β), one beta prime (β') and one omega (ω). This is just one example of a core enzyme. DNA Pol I can also be characterized as having core and holoenzyme segments, where the 5'exonuclease can be removed without destroying enzyme functionality.
