= OxyS RNA =

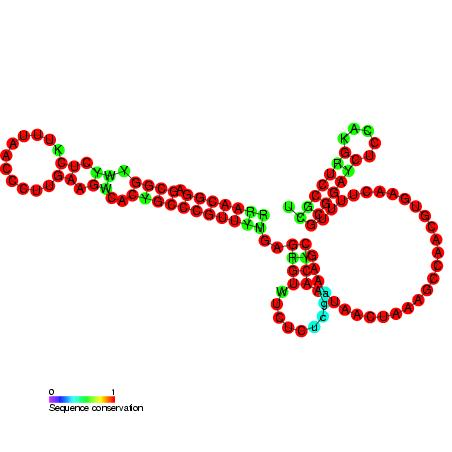
- Predicted secondary structure and sequence conservation of OxyS

Identifiers
- Symbol: OxyS
- Rfam: RF00035

Other data
- RNA type: Gene; sRNA
- Domain: Bacteria
- SO: SO:0000384
- PDB structures: PDBe

OxyS RNA is a small non-coding RNA which is induced in response to oxidative stress in Escherichia coli. This RNA acts as a global regulator to activate or repress the expression of as many as 40 genes, by an antisense mechanism, including the fhlA-encoded transcriptional activator and the rpoS-encoded sigma(s) subunit of RNA polymerase. OxyS is bound by the Hfq protein, that increases the OxyS RNA interaction with its target messages. Binding to Hfq alters the conformation of OxyS. The 109 nucleotide RNA is thought to be composed of three stem-loops.

== Target genes ==
A number of additional targets were predicted and verified using microarray analysis. These are listed below:

- yobF – confirmed by Northern analysis
- yaiZ
- rumA
- wrbA – confirmed by Northern analysis
- ybaY – confirmed by Northern analysis

Furthermore, the mRNA encoded by the nusG gene is a direct target of OxyS.
