= L. Nicholas Ornston =

American microbiologist (born 1940)

- Born: 1940; Philadelphia
- Education: Harvard University; University of California, Berkeley
- Partner(s): May Kihara (m. 1963) Donna Parke (m. 1976)
- Children: 2
- Scientific career
- Institutions: Yale University

Leo Nicholas Ornston (born 1940) is an American microbiologist who researched the evolution of microbes. He was a faculty member at Yale University from 1969–2011, where he was made the director of its Center for Biological Transformation. He has held the position of editor-in-chief at Applied and Environmental Microbiology and of co-editor at Annual Review of Microbiology.

== Early life and education ==
Leo Nicholas Ornston was born in 1940 in Philadelphia. He was named after his paternal grandfather, who was an immigrant from Russia to Philadelphia. His father Darius was a physician, and his mother Marie Wallace Ornston was a teacher. He had an elder brother, also named Darius, and two elder sisters, Mary Gray and Lenore. He and his siblings attended Germantown Friends School, a Quaker school in Philadelphia. For college, he attended Harvard University, where he was at first in a pre-medical track. For graduate school, he attended the University of California, Berkeley in the laboratory of Roger Stanier. He then did post-doctoral research in Leicester with Hans Kornberg and then at the University of Illinois at Urbana–Champaign with Irwin Gunsalus.

== Career ==
Ornston became a faculty member at Yale University in 1969. There, he researched the evolution of microbes by examining their metabolic pathways. While at Yale, he was the director of its first industry-subsidized research project, supported by Celanese. He was also made the director of its Center for Biological Transformation, the goals of which were to understand the fundamental nature of genetic mutation and apply those findings to engineer bacteria that could metabolize toxic pollutants.

Starting in 1983, he was the editor of the Annual Review of Microbiology, succeeding Mortimer P. Starr. He retired from the editor position in 2007, at which time he was succeeded by Susan Gottesman. He was also the editor of the Applied and Environmental Microbiology. Ornston retired from Yale in 2011.

== Awards and honors ==
Ornston received a Guggenheim Fellowship in 1973 for his work in molecular and cellular biology.

== Personal life ==
Ornston's first marriage was to May Kihara in 1963, whom he met at Berkeley. Together they had one child. Following his divorce from Kihara, he married Donna Parke in 1976, with whom he had another child.
