= RSSB =

RSSB may refer to:

- Rail Safety and Standards Board, a British non-for-profit independent company
- Rajasthan Staff Selection Board, selects people for the civil service in Rajasthan, India
- Radha Soami Satsang Beas, a spiritual organization based in Punjab, India
- Royal Statistical Society of Belgium
- RssB, a specialized anti-sigma factor in gene expression
- RSSB Tigers, a Rwandan professional basketball team
