= Everett Peter Greenberg =

American microbiologist

- Born: November 7, 1948 (age 77); New York City; United States
- Education: Western Washington University (BA); University of Iowa (MSc); University of Massachusetts Amherst (PhD)
- Known for: Research of quorum sensing
- Spouse: Caroline Harwood
- Awards: Shaw Prize in Life science and Medicine; Princess of Asturias Award for Technical and Scientific Research; Canada Gairdner International Award
- Scientific career
- Fields: Microbiology
- Institutions: University of Washington; University of Iowa; Cornell University; Harvard University
- Thesis: The biology of facultatively anerobic spirochetes (1977)
- Doctoral advisor: Ercole Canale-Parola

Everett Peter Greenberg (born November 7, 1948) is an American microbiologist. He is the inaugural Eugene and Martha Nester Professor of Microbiology at the Department of Microbiology of the University of Washington School of Medicine. He is best known for his research on quorum sensing, and has received multiple awards for his work.

== Early life and education ==
Greenberg was born in 1948 in New York City. When he was an infant, his family moved to San Francisco then to Seattle, where he finished high school. He became interested in biology, especially invertebrate biology, after a field trip his biology teacher organized.

Greenberg was determined to study biology after a year at Everett Junior College (now Everett Community College), and, instead of the University of Washington which he thought was too big, opted for Western Washington University in Bellingham, Washington in 1966. He graduated with a BA in Biology in 1970.

He discovered his passion for microbiology during his undergraduate years, so despite initially planning to pursue biochemistry for postgraduate study, he eventually went to the University of Iowa to conduct microbiology research, where he obtained his MSc in Microbiology in 1972. Greenberg then started his PhD at the University of Massachusetts Amherst, and received his PhD in 1977.

== Career ==
After obtaining his PhD, Greenberg spent time at Harvard University for postdoctoral work. He joined the Department of Microbiology of Cornell University as an assistant professor in 1979, and was promoted to associate professor in 1984. Greenberg went to the Department of Microbiology of the University of Iowa as a professor in 1988, and returned to Seattle in 2005 when he joined the Department of Microbiology of the University of Washington as head of the department.

Outside of academia, Greenberg was an associate editor of the Annual Review of Microbiology from 1991 to 2001.

== Research ==
Before the 1960s and 70s, bacteria were thought to be independent organisms that do not communicate with one another. The first indication of inter-bacterial communication was reported by Alexander Tomasz in 1965, who found Streptococcus pneumoniae secretes a substance that allow other S. pneumoniae to take up foreign DNA. Then in 1970, John Woodland Hastings discovered that Aliivibrio fischeri produced light and became bioluminescent under high cell density but not in diluted concentration, a phenomenon known as autoinduction. The molecule that A. fischeri secretes for autoinduction is called an autoinducer, which was not identified until 1981.

In 1985, Greenberg reported that, instead of a complex mechanism, the autoinducer simply passively diffuses from one bacterial cell to another, revealing one of the mechanisms of bacterial communication.

He switched course after moving to the University of Iowa, focusing on the luxR protein in A. fischeri; the protein is a transcription factor activated by the autoinducer. Research by Greenberg's team confirmed the C-terminus of luxR binds DNA while its N-terminus binds the autoinducer.

In a seminal article in 1994, Greenberg, together with Claiborne (Clay) Fuqua and Stephen Winans, at the time both from Cornell University, coined the term quorum sensing to describe the behavior of autoinduced bioluminescence in A. fischeri and other bacterial species.

Greenberg has also branched out from A. fischeri, collaborating with Barbara Iglewski at the University of Rochester to study quorum sensing in Pseudomonas aeruginosa, the infection of which is the primary cause of death in cystic fibrosis patients. The collaboration stemmed from Iglewski's discovery in 1991 of a P. aeruginosa gene coding for a transcription factor protein that controls the expression of genes which, in turn, control its virulence. The closest relative of the transcription factor, in terms of protein sequence, was the luxR protein. This partnership led to the discovery of three quorum sensing signaling pathways in P. aeruginosa.

His research in quorum sensing led Greenberg to study the phenomenon of biofilm, which is a high-density cluster of bacteria that attaches to each other and to surfaces and is embedded in an extracellular matrix. Notably, bacteria in biofilms are more resistant to antibiotics than their free-living counterparts. In 1998, Greenberg, Iglewski, and J. William Costerton reported the link between quorum-sensing genes and biofilm formation, the first publication to show a genetic factor in biofilm structure. Over the next years, he kept studying biofilms and their effects on diseases, discovering that lungs of cystic fibrosis patients are infected with biofilms, and that iron is required for P. aeruginosa biofilm formation.

== Personal life ==
Greenberg met his wife, Caroline Harwood, during his PhD years at the University of Massachusetts Amherst. They started dating when he was a postdoctoral researcher at Harvard University, and were married in 1984. Harwood is currently also a professor at the Department of Microbiology of the University of Washington School of Medicine.

== Honors and awards ==
- Fellow of the American Association for the Advancement of Science (1989)
- Member of the American Academy of Arts and Sciences (2002)
- Member of the National Academy of Sciences (2004)
- Shaw Prize in Life Science and Medicine (2015)
- Princess of Asturias Award for Technical and Scientific Research (2023)
- Canada Gairdner International Award (2023)
