= RNA-OUT =

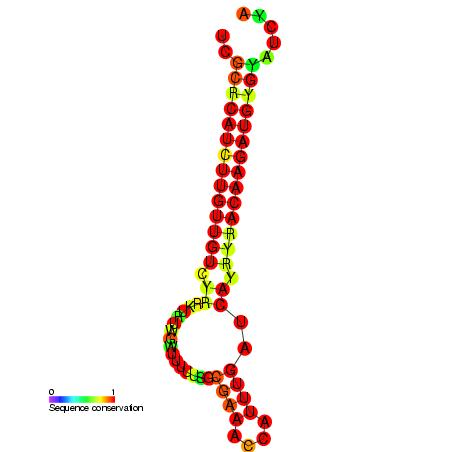
- Predicted secondary structure and sequence conservation of RNA-OUT

Identifiers
- Symbol: RNA-OUT
- Rfam: RF00240

Other data
- RNA type: Gene; antisense
- Domain(s): Bacteria
- SO: SO:0000644
- PDB structures: PDBe

RNA-OUT is a non-coding RNA that is antisense to the RNA-IN non-coding RNA. Transposition of insertion sequence IS10 is regulated by an anti-sense RNA which inhibits transposase expression when IS10 is present in multiple copies per cell. IS10 antisense pairing is facilitated by the RNA-binding protein, Hfq. RNA-OUT consists of a stem-loop domain topped by a flexibly paired loop; the 5′ end of the target molecule, RNA-IN, is complementary to the top of the loop, and complementarity extends for 35 nucleotides down one side of RNA-OUT.
