= RpoE =

ECF RNA polymerase sigma-E factor

Identifiers
- Organism: Escherichia coli (strain K12)
- Symbol: rpoE
- Alt. symbols: sigE
- Entrez: 67175910
- Orthologs: NCBI: entry; OMA: entry
- PDB: 1OR7, 2H27, 5OR5, 6JBQ
- RefSeq (mRNA): NC_000913
- RefSeq (Prot): NP_417068
- UniProt: P0AGB6

Other data
- Chromosome: genomic: 2.71 - 2.71 Mb
Search for
- Structures: Swiss-model
- Domains: InterPro

The gene rpoE (RNA polymerase, extracytoplasmic E) encodes the sigma factor sigma-24 (σ24, sigma E, or RpoE), a protein in Escherichia coli and other species of bacteria. Depending on the bacterial species, this gene may be referred to as sigE.

RpoE appears to be necessary for the exocytoplasmic stress response. E. coli mutants without rpoE cannot grow at high temperatures (that is, above 42 degrees C) and show growth defects at lower temperatures, though this may be due to compensatory mutations.

The stress response regulation activities of RpoE are modulated by the Hfq protein in E. coli.
