= Charles E. Clifton =

American microbiologist

- Born: March 23, 1904; Etna, Ohio
- Died: October 7, 1976 (aged 72); Santa Clara, California
- Citizenship: US
- Education: Ohio State University; University of Minnesota
- Partner: Esther Ora Carlson (m. 1932)
- Children: 2
- Scientific career
- Institutions: Kodak; Stanford University
- Thesis: Potentiometric Studies of Sugar Oxidation: A Determination of Active Glucose (1928)
- Doctoral advisor: John Mouk Ort

Charles Egolf Clifton (March 23, 1904 – October 7, 1976) was an American microbiologist. He was a faculty member at Stanford University for forty years, authored two textbooks, and was the editor of the peer-reviewed journal the Annual Review of Microbiology for twenty-five years.

== Early life and education ==
Charles Egolf Clifton was born on March 23, 1904, in Etna, Licking County, Ohio to parents Lulu née Egolf and Allen Benton Clifton. He had one sister, Margaret Kuhn. He graduated from the Ohio State University with a bachelor's degree in 1925 and a master's degree in physical chemistry in 1926.

Clifton attended the University of Minnesota for his PhD, graduating in 1928. He said that he received the first PhD in biophysics awarded in the US.

== Career ==
After graduating, Clifton worked at Kodak's research laboratories for several months. Clifton was an instructor at the University of Minnesota before getting hired by Stanford University in 1929 to teach bacteriology. In 1936 and 1937, he took a sabbatical leave from Stanford to do research at Cambridge University with Marjory Stephenson and in Delft, Netherlands with Albert Kluyver. World War II labor shortages caused him to agree to teach microbiology courses at San Jose State University. His research included new ways to manufacture penicillin. He also authored the textbooks An Introduction to the Bacteria and An Introduction to Bacterial Physiology. He was a member of several scientific societies, including the American Society of Microbiologists, the Society for Experimental Biology and Medicine, and Sigma Xi. From 1969 to his death in 1976, he was a professor emeritus in the Department of Medical Microbiology at Stanford.

He was the first editor of the peer-reviewed journal the Annual Review of Microbiology, which was first published in 1947. He remained editor through 1972 and was succeeded by Mortimer P. Starr.

== Personal life and death ==
Charles Clifton married Esther Ora née Carlson of Bruce, South Dakota, on September 7, 1932. He and Esther had two sons, Charles Jr. and John. During the 1950s, he had two major surgeries; while recovering from the second surgery, he began painting with watercolors as a hobby. He also enjoyed gardening. He died on October 7, 1976, in Santa Clara, California.
