= Annual Review of Microbiology =

- Discipline: Microbiology
- Language: English
- Edited by: Andrew L. Goodman and Gisela Storz

Publication details
- History: 1947–present, 79 years old
- Publisher: Annual Reviews (United States)
- Frequency: Annually
- Open access: Subscribe to Open
- Impact factor: 12.2 (2025)

Standard abbreviations
- ISO 4: Annu. Rev. Microbiol.

Indexing
- CODEN: ARMIAZ
- ISSN: 0066-4227 (print); 1545-3251 (web)
- OCLC no.: 1201534920

Links
- Journal homepage

The Annual Review of Microbiology is a peer-reviewed academic journal that publishes review articles about microbiology. It was first published in 1947 as the third journal title released by Annual Reviews (AR). It covers significant developments in the field of microbiology, including the study of bacteria, archaea, viruses, and unicellular eukaryotes. Of its editors, Charles E. Clifton and L. Nicholas Ornston served more than twenty years each. As of 2026, Susan Gottesman was succeeded by Andrew L. Goodman and Gisela Storz. As of 2023, the Annual Review of Microbiology is being published as open access, under the Subscribe to Open model.

== History ==
The Annual Review of Microbiology was first published in 1947, the third journal title released by Annual Reviews (AR), a nonprofit organization whose stated mission is to synthesize knowledge "for the progress of science and the benefit of society." It followed titles in biochemistry and physiology. Its first editor was Charles E. Clifton.

From 1956 to 1958, Pierre Grabar provided a summary of the microbiologic literature appearing in the Russian language through a partnership with the National Science Foundation. This was no longer necessary as abstracts became increasingly common, as well as translations from Russian to English. From 1986 onward, the journal placed more of an emphasis on parasites. As of 2020, it was published both in print and electronically.

It defines its scope as microbiology, including bacteria, archaea, viruses, and unicellular eukaryotes. As of 2026, Journal Citation Reports lists the journal's 2025 impact factor as 12.2, ranking it twelfth of 167 journal titles in the category "Microbiology".

== Editorial processes ==
The Annual Review of Microbiology is helmed by the editor. The editor is assisted by the editorial committee, which includes associate editors, regular members, and occasionally guest editors. Guest members participate at the invitation of the editor, and serve terms of one year. All other members of the editorial committee are appointed by the AR board of directors and serve five-year terms. The editorial committee determines which topics should be included in each volume and solicits reviews from qualified authors. Unsolicited manuscripts are not accepted. Peer review of accepted manuscripts is undertaken by the editorial committee.

=== Editors of volumes ===
Dates indicate publication years in which someone was credited as a lead editor or co-editor of a journal volume. The planning process for a volume begins well before the volume appears, so appointment to the position of lead editor generally occurred prior to the first year shown here. An editor who has retired or died may be credited as a lead editor of a volume that they helped to plan, even if it is published after their retirement or death.

- Charles E. Clifton (1947–1972)
- Mortimer P. Starr (1973–1982)
- L. Nicholas Ornston (1983–2007)
- Susan Gottesman (2008–2026)
- Andrew L. Goodman and Gisela Storz (2026–present)

=== Current editorial committee ===
As of 2022, the editorial committee consists of the editor and the following members:

- Andrew L. Goodman
- Caroline S. Harwood
- Jeff F. Miller
- L. David Sibley
- Lotte Søgaard-Andersen
- Jason E. Stajich
- Lianhui Zhang
