= RpoN =

RNA polymerase sigma-54 factor

Identifiers
- Organism: Escherichia coli (strain K12)
- Symbol: rpoN
- Alt. symbols: glnF, ntrA
- Entrez: 947714
- Orthologs: NCBI: entry; OMA: entry
- PDB: 2MT3, 8F1I, 8F1J, 8F1K, 9MSE, 9MSF, 9MSG, 9MSH, 9MSJ
- RefSeq (mRNA): NC_000913
- RefSeq (Prot): NP_417669
- UniProt: P24255

Other data
- Chromosome: genomic: 3.34 - 3.35 Mb
Search for
- Structures: Swiss-model
- Domains: InterPro

The gene rpoN (RNA polymerase, nitrogen-limitation N) encodes the sigma factor sigma-54 (σ54, sigma N, or RpoN), a protein in Escherichia coli and other species of bacteria. RpoN antagonizes RpoS sigma factors.

== Biological role ==
Originally identified as a regulator of genes involved in nitrogen metabolism and assimilation under nitrogen limiting conditions, E. coli σ54 has since been shown to play important regulatory roles in a variety of other cellular processes. Similarly, σ54 homologues in other species regulate a wide range of processes, including flagellar synthesis and virulence.

== Sequence specificity and mechanism of action ==
Sigma-54 factor, Activator interacting domain

Identifiers
- Symbol: Sigma54_AID
- Pfam: PF00309
- InterPro: IPR000394
- PROSITE: PS50044
Available protein structures:
- PDB: 5BYH IPR000394 PF00309 (ECOD; PDBsum)
- AlphaFold: IPR000394; PF00309

σ54 promoter elements consist of conserved nucleotides located at −12 and −24 with respect to the transcription start site. This contrasts with members of the σ70 family, which recognize conserved promoter elements located at roughly −10 and −35 with respect to the transcription start site. Unlike the members of the σ70 family, σ54 proteins have been shown to bind promoter DNA independent of core RNAPin vitro. Another distinguishing characteristic of σ54 proteins is their absolute requirement for activator proteins, known as bacterial enhancer binding proteins (bEBPs), to initiate transcription. Thus, both active and inactive forms of RNAP:σ54 are bound at promoters.

The RpoN-regulated promoter elements have the consensus sequence as follows: TTGGCACGGTTTTTGCT.
