= Pierre Grabar =

French biochemist and immunologist (1898–1986)

- Born: September 10, 1898; Kiev, Russian Empire
- Died: January 26, 1986 (aged 87); Paris, France
- Education: École des Hautes Études Industrielles, University of Strasbourg, Sorbonne
- Known for: Immunoelectrophoresis
- Scientific career
- Fields: Immunology, biochemistry
- Workplaces: University of Strasbourg, Institut Pasteur, l'Institut de recherches sur le cancer (CNRS)

Pierre Grabar (September 10, 1898 – January 26, 1986) was a Russian-born French biochemist and immunologist. He was the founding president of the Société Française d'Immunologie. He studied antigen-antibody reactions and developed a "carrier" theory of antibody function. His award-winning development of Immunoelectrophoresis made it possible to identify specific bodily proteins, opening new avenues in medical research.

Grabar helped to rebuild the field of French and European immunology after World War II though his teaching and research. He welcomed many international students to his laboratory, which has been described as "extraordinarily vibrant and active" and "one of the best in the world".

In 1963 Grabar received a Canada Gairdner International Award and in 1968 the Prix Jaffé. In 1958, he received the Emil von Behring Prize and in 1977 the Robert Koch Medal. Grabar became a member of the German National Academy of Sciences Leopoldina in 1962. He was an officer in the French Legion of Honor.

== Childhood and studies ==
Pierre Grabar was born in Kiev, Russian Empire, on September 10, 1898. His father was Nicolas (Nikolay S.) Grabar (1852–1924), a lawyer and State Counsellor at the Court of Cassation of St Petersburg. His mother was Baroness Elisabeth de Prittwitz (1866–1924), an artist of German origin. His older brother André Grabar became a prominent professor of ancient Christian and Byzantine archaeology and art.

Grabar completed high school in Kiev in 1916. During the Russian Revolution of 1917, Grabar's family fled the country to France. In the Russian Civil War Grabar was an officer in the White Army.

In 1921, Grabar went to France. He entered the École des Hautes Études Industrielles in Lille, France and obtained a chemical engineering degree in 1924. Grabar became a naturalized citizen of France on August 8, 1929.

Grabar received a doctorate from the University of Strasbourg in 1930, after working on uremia and salt deficiency (see below). He also earned a Doctor of Sciences degree from the Sorbonne in 1942, for his work on ultrafiltration and its applications.

== Career ==
After working briefly in industry Grabar became chief (chef de laboratoire) of a clinical laboratory at the University of Strasbourg from 1926 to 1930. There he began doing medical research on kidney function with professor Leon Blum. Grabar received his doctorate in 1930, having worked on uremia and salt deficiency and published "Azotemie par manque de sel" (Uremia due to salt deficiency).

From 1930 to 1936, Grabar became assistant to Maurice Nicloux in the department of clinical medicine at the University of Strasbourg. Grabar then developed a technique of fractionation of proteins through nitrocellulose ultrafilters of defined porosity, making it possible to specify the dimensions of proteins, toxins and viruses. This work was confirmed later by electron microscopy.

In 1937-1938 Grabar was a Rockefeller Foundation Fellow at Columbia University in New York, USA. There he met the founder of quantitative immunology, Michael Heidelberger and found his vocation for the relatively new science of immunology.

Returning to Paris in 1938, Grabar joined the Institut Pasteur as head of the laboratory (Chef de Laboratoire) from 1938 to 1946. He served as head of microbial chemistry (Chef de Service de Chimie microbienne) from 1946 to 1960.

During the 1950s, a time when translations of abstracts and papers often were not available, Grabar contributed to the Annual Review of Microbiology by writing reviews of recent Russian research. In 1954, Grabar was president of the Société française de biochimie et de biologie moléculaire (SFBBM, originally named the Société de Chimie Biologique). In 1966, Pierre Grabar founded the Société Française d'Immunologie (SFI), serving as its first president from 1966 to 1969.

From 1960 to 1968 Grabar was director of l'Institut de recherches sur le cancer (Cancer Research Institute) of the Centre National de la Recherche Scientifique (CNRS) in Villejuif, France where he carried out research on proteins and cancer.

In 1969, Grabar returned to the Pasteur Institute, where he was named honorary chief (chef de service honoraire).

== Immuno-electrophoretic analysis ==
In 1948, Grabar began to expand on the work of the physico-chemist Arne Tiselius, who won a Nobel Prize in chemistry for his work on the electrophoresis of macromolecules. Pierre Grabar spent several years simplifying Tiselius' methodology, modifying his method by introducing antibodies.

In 1953 Grabar developed immunoelectrophoresis, combining electrophoresis and immunochemical analysis to create an "immuno-electrophoretic method". He used a gel medium, designed by Jacques Oudin, also at the Institut Pasteur, and developed the immunoelectrophoretic analysis method with the help of American student Curtis A. Williams Jr.

Firstly, electrophoresis of the substance to be studied is carried out in a 1.5-2% agar gel ... Then the precipitating immune serum is diffused perpendicularly to the electrophoretic migration axis. Each constituent of the mixture studied gives an independent specific precipitation band, which can be distinguished owing to its immunological specificity and defined by its relative electrophoretic mobility.

They published a brief introductory report in 1953 and a longer exposition in 1955, both in Biochimica et Biophysica Acta. Simple and inexpensive, immunoelectrophoresis quickly became a widely used method of analysis in clinical biology with application in a broad range of areas. As of 1980, the 1955 paper was considered a "Citation classic" with over 680 citations.

The paper describes a simple method which in a single operation enables the definition of complex mixtures of antigens or haptens by three independent criteria: the chemical or biochemical properties of the antigens (using various dyes or enzyme substrates), their electrophoretic mobility, and their antigenic specificity.

Grabar and Williams discussed applications of the technique to the study of serum proteins in three further papers in the Journal of Immunology. These focused on immunological studies of human serum fractions; antiserum types and the distribution of their constituent antibodies; and human γ-globulin.

== Immunological phenomena ==
Grabar's research on immunological phenomena led him to have unorthodox views on the role of molecules. Grabar suggested that immune mechanisms could be viewed in terms of transporter functions, part of a normal system for handling metabolic and catabolic substances. This hypothesis was disputed by many of his contemporaries who viewed them as defensive mechanisms. Pierre Grabar fiercely defended his position for many years, confirming his theory through experiments. This idea has since become accepted.

== Selected publications ==
- Blum, Léon; Grabar, Pierre; Van Caulaert, Camille (1928). L'azotémie par manque de sel (Azotemia due to lack of salt) (in French). Paris: Masson & cie.
- Grabar, Pierre; Williams, Curtis A. (January 1955). "Méthode immuno-électrophorétique d'analyse de mélanges de substances antigéniques". Biochimica et Biophysica Acta. 17 (1): 67–74. doi:10.1016/0006-3002(55)90320-6. PMID 13239629.
- Grabar, Pierre; Nowinski, Wiktor W.; Genereaux, Bruce D. (August 1956). "Use of Pectin in Gel Electrophoresis". Nature. 178 (4530): 430. Bibcode:1956Natur.178..430G. doi:10.1038/178430a0. PMID 13358775.
- Grabar, P.; Burtin, P. (1960). Analyse immuno-électrophorétique: ses applications aux liquides biologiques humains (Immuno-electrophoretic analysis: Its applications to human biological fluids) (in French). Paris: Masson.
- Grabar, Pierre (June 1974). "" Self " and " Not-Self " in Immunology". The Lancet. 303 (7870): 1320–1322. doi:10.1016/S0140-6736(74)90685-0. PMID 4134299.
- Grabar, Pierre (September 1975). "The "globulines-transporteurs" theory and auto-sensitization". Medical Hypotheses. 1 (5): 172–175. doi:10.1016/0306-9877(75)90045-6. PMID 765700.
- Grabar, Pierre (November 1975). "Hypothesis. Auto-antibodies and immunological theories: An analytical review". Clinical Immunology and Immunopathology. 4 (4): 453–466. doi:10.1016/0090-1229(75)90087-2. PMID 1239347.
- Grabar, Pierre (December 1983). "Autoantibodies and the physiological role of immunoglobulins". Immunology Today. 4 (12): 337–340. doi:10.1016/0167-5699(83)90169-X. PMID 25290932.
- Grabar, Pierre (2006). "Immunoelectrophoretic Analysis". Immunoelectrophoretic Analysis (reprint). Vol. 7. pp. 1–38. doi:10.1002/9780470110232.ch1. ISBN 978-0-470-11023-2.

== Awards and honors ==
- 1935, Inaugural recipient of the Prix Maurice Nicloux, with R. Guillemet.
- 1958, Emil-von Behring Prize, Philipps University of Marburg
- 1962, Member of the German National Academy of Sciences Leopoldina in the Microbiology and Immunologist category
- 1963, Canada Gairdner International Award
- 1968, Prix Jaffé
- 1969, Member, Académie Nationale de Médecine (French National Academy of Medicine)
- 1977, Robert Koch Medal
- Officier of the Ordre national de la Légion d'honneur (French Legion of Honor)
