= Type VIII secretion system =

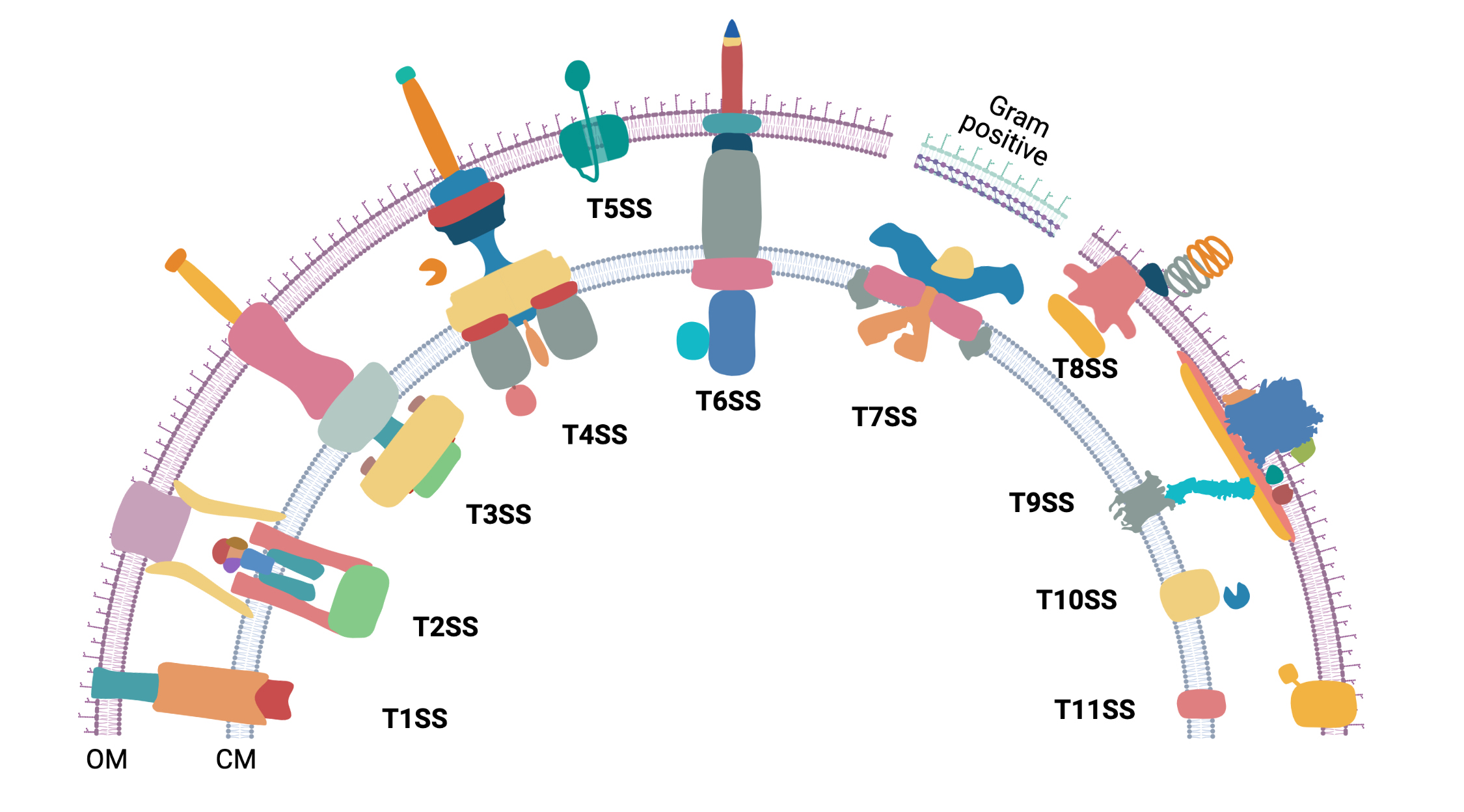
Currently identified secretion systems

A Type VIII secretion system is a type of secretion system found within the inner and outer membranes of gram-negative bacteria. This system is also referred to as the curli biogenesis pathway or the extracellular nucleation-precipitation pathway. It is associated with the formation of biofilms and infecting hosts. Curli formation is especially efficient at evading the host's immune system due to the subunits being able to quickly assemble in a single process and not having intermediates. This system is associated with curli-specific genes and utilizes multiple proteins in its process to form curli fibers. These proteins include CsgA CsgB, CsgC, CsgD, CsgE, CsgF, and CsgG. Type VIII secretion system facilitates the assembly and translocation of curli fibers.

== Curli fibers and their virulence ==
Curli fibers are made through the curli biogenesis system, also known as the type VIII secretion system, and are essentially long, linear structures made from proteins that are secreted to the outside of the cell into its surrounding environment. They are made mostly by gram-negative bacteria and, upon secretion, they form compact clusters around the outside of the cell. The main function of the curli fibers involves their interactions with biofilms. In pathogenic bacteria, curlis can contribute to virulence by helping in cell invasion and activating the innate immune response.

Knowing how curli fibers are made, and how the type VIII secretion system works, can help develop an inhibitor to stop or reduce the production of these curli fibers and overall reduce the virulence of the bacteria that produce them. Understanding these mechanisms can also play a big role in creating treatments for infections that are associated with biofilms.

== Curli development and control ==
Curli biogenesis is an adaptable process that uses a direct route and can transform from an intrinsically disordered complex system to a simple amyloid state. The proteins in this system are encoded by two separate operons. One operon codes for CsgA, CsgB, and CsgC, whereas the other codes for CsgD, CsgE, CsgF, and CsgG. The two major subunits involved in this process are CsgA and CsgB, with CsgA being the most important to the system. CsgA and CsgB are responsible for the system's control and extension of fibers. CsgA can transition from a disorder to an ordered amyloid state while the CsgB functions as a nucleator to help promote the polymerization of CsgA. Then, CsgC is introduced as a chaperone and works to keep CsgA from reaching the amyloid state prematurely. The process by which CsgC prevents this is still misunderstood, but the positive charge beta-strand is most theorized. CsgG is part of a secretion channel that facilitates the translocation of CsgA to the periplasm. CsgE functions as a specificity binder to help guide CsgA to the CsgG secretion channel so that CsgA will be the correct conformation for polymerization. Throughout this process, CsgF interacts with CsgA and CsgB to help enhance the assembly of CsgA and coordinate the nucleating activity of CsgB. CsgD functions as a transcriptional regulator that influences the expression of CsgA and CsgB through environmental factors.

The resulting structure is made up of alternating CsgA and CsgB subunits with CsgF unit at the base and the entirety of the structure will be on the outside of the bacterial cell.

== Secretion mechanisms ==
The secretion of the assembled units requires energy. Energy within a bacterial cell is typically supplied by ATP or GTP, proton motive force, or other membrane potentials. However, with type VIII secretions systems, it is unlikely that energy is derived from one of these typical methods due to its location on the outer membrane of gram-negative bacteria. The CsgG protein complex is the channel used to allow the assembled CsgA, CsgB, and CsgF subunits to move through the membrane to the outside of the cell where they remain near the CsgG protein. It is thought that the energy released from the subunits folding and unfolding as well as the potential from the movement of the subunits across the membrane gives the necessary energy for secretion. While the type VIII secretion pathway is most desirable, some bacterial species may use the functional amyloid pathway, or Fap, to form a biofilm so it can attach to surfaces.
