= Audrey Stevens Niyogi =

American biochemist (1932–2010)

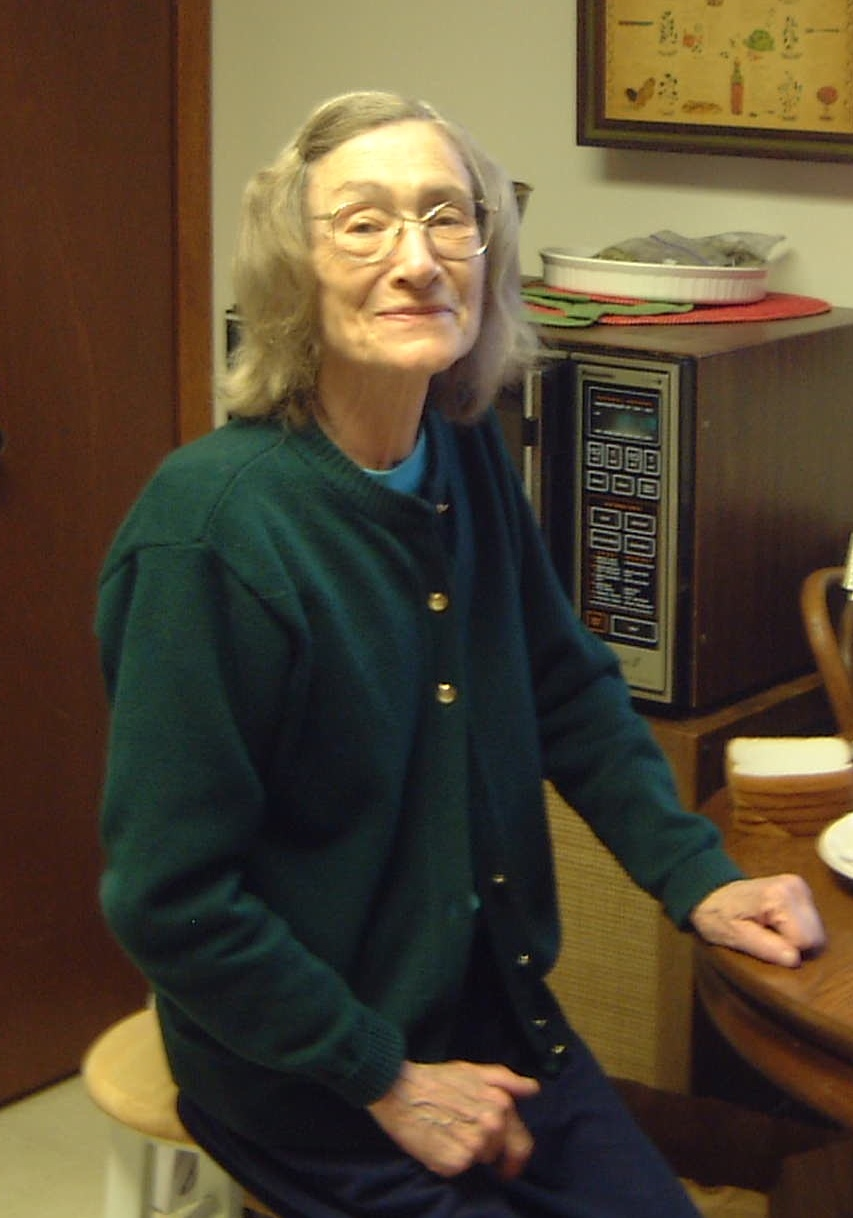
- Audrey Stevens Niyogi, co-discoverer of RNA polymerase, at home in Oak Ridge, TN, February 12, 2002
- Born: Audrey Louise Stevens; 21 July 1932; Leigh, Nebraska, United States
- Died: 28 February 2010 (aged 77); Oak Ridge, Tennessee, US
- Education: Indiana University (BS); Wayne State College (AA); Iowa State University (BS, 1953); Case Western Reserve University (PhD, 1958)
- Known for: Co-discoverer of RNA polymerase
- Spouse: Salil Kumar Niyogi
- Children: Kris Kumar Niyogi; Dev Kumar Niyogi
- Awards: Election to the National Academy of Sciences

Audrey Stevens Niyogi (July 21, 1932 – February 28, 2010) was an American biochemist, best known as a co-discoverer of RNA polymerase.

== Early life and education ==
Audrey Stevens Niyogi was born on a farm near Leigh, Nebraska, the third child of Louise and John Stevens. She had an older brother Travis and a fraternal twin sister Ardyce. Later the family moved to another farm about 10 miles from Wayne, Nebraska. When teenagers, Audrey and Ardyce boarded with a family in town so they could attend high school without the long commute.

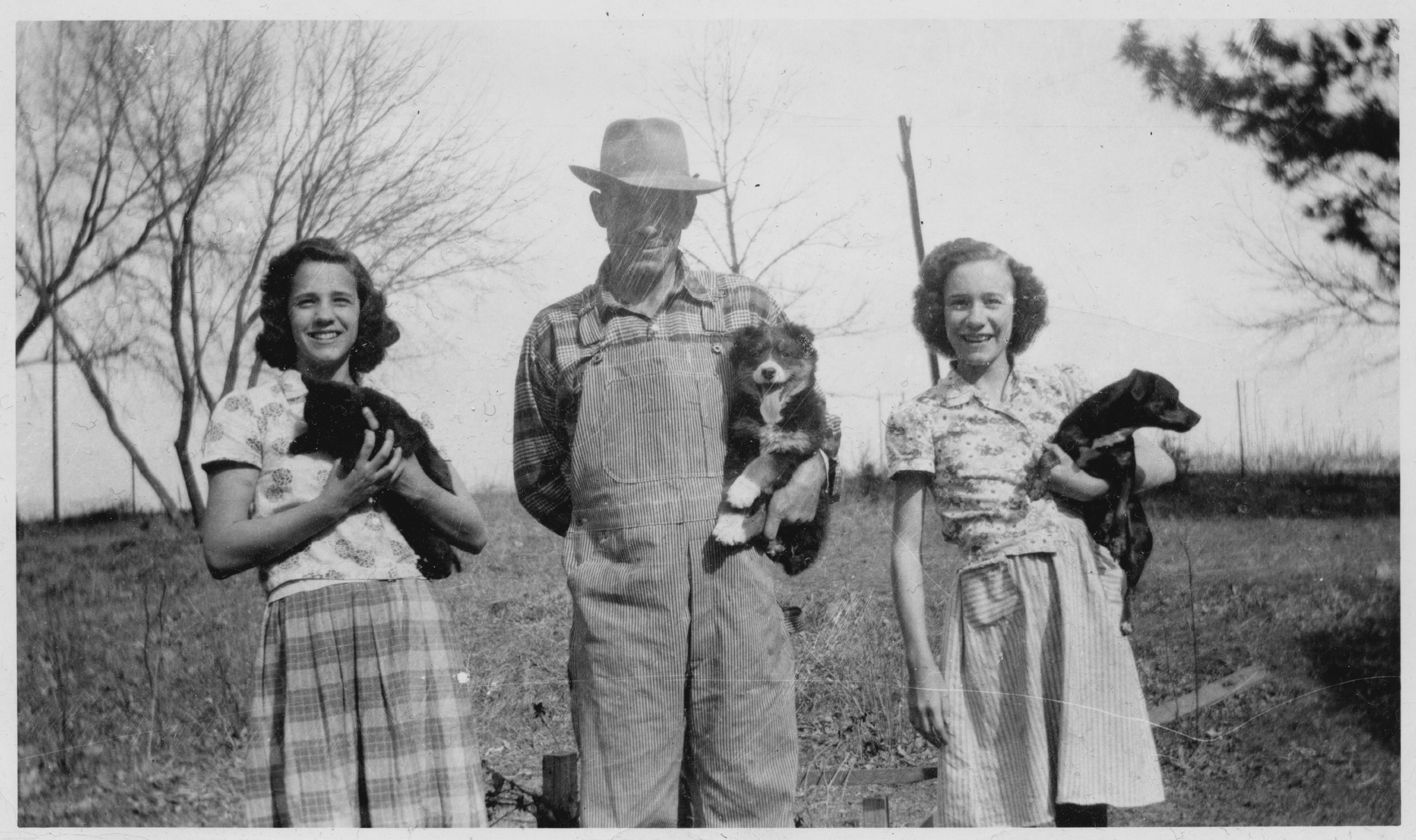
From left to right: Ardyce, John, and Audrey Stevens.

Audrey pursued the study of chemistry following in her older brother’s footsteps, who pursued a career in organic chemistry. After 2 years at the Nebraska State Teachers College (now Wayne State College), she earned her BS in chemistry from Iowa State College (now Iowa State University) in 1953, and her PhD in biochemistry from Case Western Reserve University in 1958.

== Scientific career ==
While a postdoctoral researcher at NIH, Audrey Stevens independently conducted original experiments demonstrating the synthesis of RNA in E. coli cells. Thus, she is one of 4 researchers credited with the discovery of RNA polymerase. From there, Audrey became a professor at St. Louis University School of Medicine and then spent time at the University of Maryland School of Medicine, before settling at Oak Ridge National Laboratory, where she spent the rest of her career.

In 1972, Stevens isolated a 10 kDa protein from E.coli infected with T4 bacteriophage which inhibited RNA polymerase. This protein is an anti-sigma factor which has been named "Audrey Stevens' Inhibitor".

== Election to the National Academy of Sciences ==
In 1998, Audrey Stevens Niyogi was elected to the National Academy of Sciences in recognition of her many valuable contributions to the field of biochemistry.

== Personal life ==
Audrey was an early pioneer in balancing a scientific career with family life. In 1964, she married a fellow biochemist, Salil Kumar Niyogi. They remained married until their deaths in 2010. Together they had 2 sons, Krishna and Dev Niyogi, who also pursued careers in the biological sciences. After her second son was born in 1967, in order to devote more time to parenting, Audrey had her position at ORNL officially changed to half time. Although she continued to work hours that were closer to full-time, this gave her the flexibility to be more available to her children. She continued conducting experiments and publishing in peer-reviewed scientific journals into her late 60's.
