= Mortimer P. Starr =

American microbiologist

- Born: April 13, 1917; New York City, New York, U.S.
- Died: April 29, 1989 (aged 72); Davis, California, U.S.
- Education: Brooklyn College (BS)Cornell University (MS, PhD)
- Partner: Phoebe Butwenig Starr
- Children: 3
- Scientific career
- Institutions: Brooklyn College; Hopkins Marine Station; University of California, Davis
- Thesis: Studies of phytopathogenic bacteria (1943)
- Doctoral advisor: Walter H. Burkholder

Mortimer Paul Starr (April 13, 1917–April 29, 1989) was an American microbiologist. After graduating with a PhD at Cornell, he briefly taught at Brooklyn College before accepting a position at University of California, Davis, where he stayed for thirty-seven years. He was considered an expert on plant pathology, particularly in plant diseases caused by bacteria.

== Early life and education ==
Mortimer Paul Starr was born in New York City on April 13, 1917, to parents Fannie née Blank and Morris Starr. He had two brothers, Theodore and Daniel. He received a bachelor's degree in biology and chemistry from Brooklyn College. He then attended Cornell University, graduating with a master's degree in bacteriology and dairy science in 1939 and a PhD in bacteriology in 1943 under Walter H. Burkholder.

== Career ==
While finishing his PhD, Starr returned to Brooklyn College as an assistant professor of biology. He took a two-year leave of absence from Brooklyn College to conduct research at Hopkins Marine Station as a National Research Fellow. In 1947, he accepted a position at the University of California, Davis as an assistant professor of bacteriology. He would remain at UC Davis for the rest of his career, a total of thirty-seven years. He was considered an expert on plant pathology, particularly the metabolism of plant diseases caused by bacteria. In 1949, he spent three months in Colombia to help identify a plant pathogen that was killing pasture crops used by dairy farmers. While there, he was also a professor at the National University of Colombia in Medellín. His research in Colombia was supported by the United States Department of State and the National Federation of Coffee Growers of Colombia. In 1953, Starr was awarded a research fellowship to spend six months at Cambridge University, followed by time at Delft University of Technology in the Netherlands. In 1973, he succeeded Charles E. Clifton as the editor of the academic journal the Annual Review of Microbiology. He remained the editor of the journal until 1982, at which time he was succeeded by L. Nicholas Ornston.

Starr was the editor of several books, including The Prokaryotes: a handbook on habitats, isolation, and identification of bacteria (1981). He was a member of several scientific organizations including Sigma Xi, the Society of American Bacteriologists, the New York Academy of Sciences, the American Phytopathological Society, the American Association for the Advancement of Science, and the Society for General Microbiology.

== Awards and honors ==
In 1947, Mortimer Starr received an Honors Day Award from Brooklyn College. Starr was a two-time recipient of a Guggenheim Fellowship, receiving the award in 1957 and 1968.

== Personal life ==
Starr married Phoebe née Butwenig in 1944; together, they had three children. He died in Davis, California, on April 29, 1989 at the age of 72.
