= Susan Gottesman =

American microbiologist

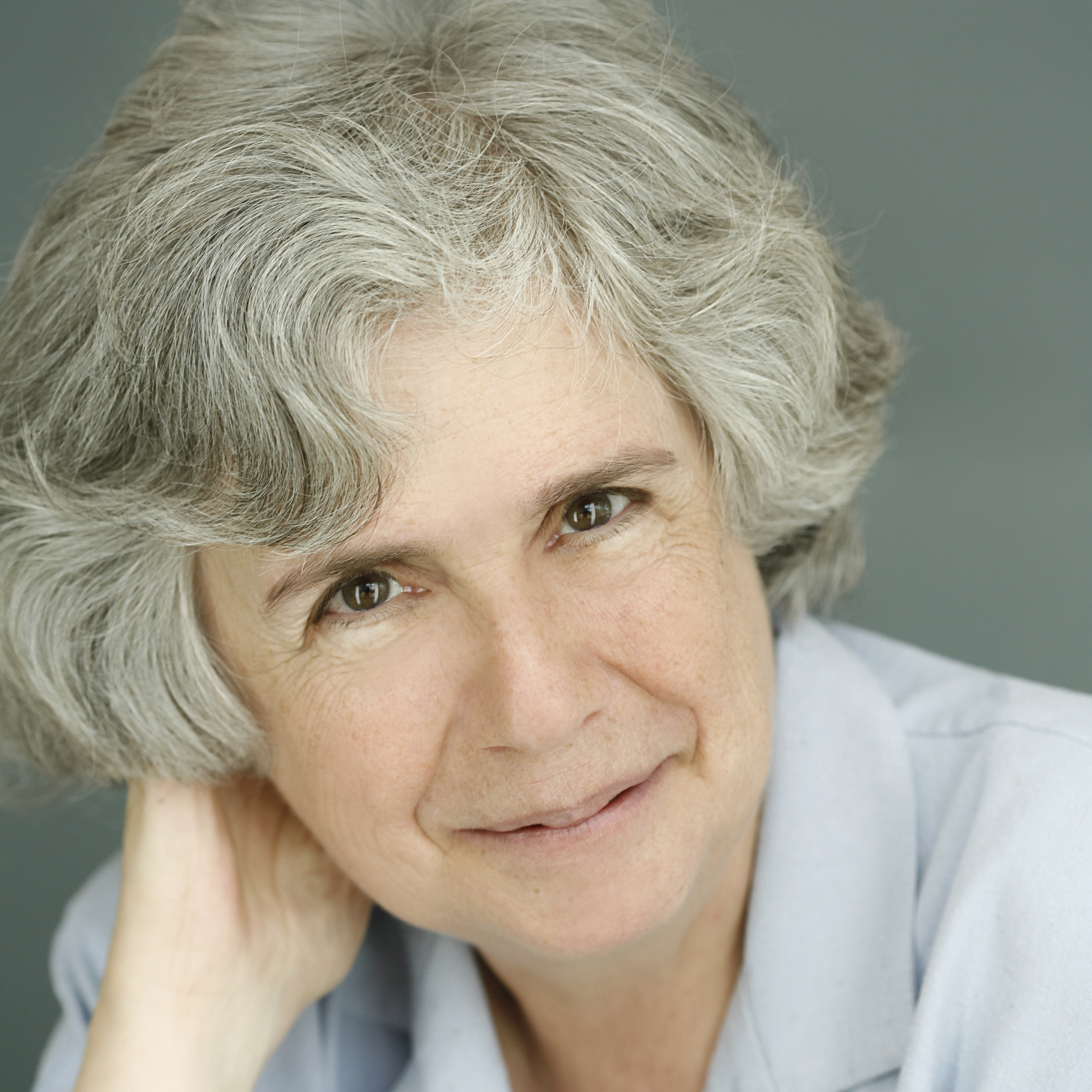
- Born: May 19, 1945 (age 81); New York, New York
- Education: Radcliffe College; Harvard University
- Known for: Bacterial small RNAs; Proteases and their function in ATP-hydrolysis.; Discovered central features of new family of proteases requiring energy for their function in the form of ATP-hydrolysis.
- Spouse: Michael M. Gottesman
- Children: Rebecca Gottesman
- Scientific career
- Fields: Genetics; Microbial biology
- Workplaces: National Institutes of Health
- Thesis: (1972)

Susan Gottesman is a microbiologist at the National Cancer Institute (NCI), which is part of the National Institutes of Health. Gottesman was the editor of the Annual Review of Microbiology from 2008-2026.

She is a pioneer in the area of biological regulation in which enzymes that destroy specific other proteins, called proteases, play a central role inside the cell. She discovered and elucidated the central features of a new family of proteases that require energy for their function in the form of ATP-hydrolysis. She has also played a major role in the discovery and characterization of bacterial small RNAs.

== Early life and education ==
Gottesman was born on May 19, 1945, in New York. Her father was trained as an accountant and ran a company that made rotisseries and other small appliances. Her mother was a high school teacher and later became a guidance counselor.

In fifth or sixth grade, Gottesman was given a book titled Microbe Hunters. This book inspired her scientific career as she became fascinated with the importance and puzzling nature of scientific research.

She continued her curiosity in science by attending a summer program in high school. It was a research opportunity held at Waldemar in Long Island, New York. Gottesman attributed this opportunity to the emphasis on science and technology during the Cold War. This experience helped fuel her passion for science, as she was introduced to genetics, DNA, cancer, and bacteria.

Gottesman received a B.A. in biochemical sciences in 1967 from Radcliffe College and a Ph.D. in microbiology from Harvard University in 1972. She did her postdoctoral training from 1971 to 1974 in NCI's Laboratory of Molecular Biology. From 1974 to 1976, she was a research associate at the Massachusetts Institute of Technology before returning as a senior investigator to NCI's Laboratory of Molecular Biology. She is co-chief of that Laboratory and head of its Biochemical Genetics Section.

== Scientific contributions ==
Gottesman was a graduate student at Harvard in the 1960s and worked with Jon Beckwith. Their work involved studying the lac operon to further understand the E. coli arabinose operon. From their research, they were able to show that a transducing bacteriophage could work for the arabinose operon. Previous studies had only shown success in the lac operon, but the lambda phage was successful for the arabinose operon in her testing. Gottesman's later research at the National Institutes of Health used this lambda phage to understand how bacteriophages are able to insert themselves into a bacterial chromosome and then subsequently remove themselves.

Susan Gottesman is known for her work with small RNAs and ATP-dependent proteases. Her work in these subjects has been celebrated by scientists such as Princeton University professor Thomas Silhavy and former Princeton professor David Botstein. Gottesman focused her research on E. coli cells and the process of gene regulation. She began studying the mechanism for energy-dependent proteolysis, but stumbled upon small RNAs in the process. Small RNA are short RNA sequences that have a wide variety of functions within cells. They have been shown to be vital in cell processes such as growth, cell differentiation, and defense. The small RNAs have also been shown to be a factor in certain diseases such as cancer, diabetes, and liver disease.

The ATP-dependent proteases are shown to maintain the level of regulatory proteins and to get rid of any misfolded or damaged proteins. They bind to their specific substrates by sequence recognition or by chemical and conformation interactions.

In Gottesman's studies, she showed that the ATP-dependent proteases are regulated by the delivery of their substrate molecules by anti-adaptor and adaptor protein. This finding has been shown of specific importance in the study of bacterial general stress response. Along with the ATP-dependent proteases, the small RNA molecules are an important part of this response.

For example, one of these small RNAs in Gottesman's research was found to positively regulate the translation of RpoS, a stress sigma factor of E. coli. The DsrA small RNA helps to translate the RpoS factor by binding to the RpoS leader sequence.

== Awards and honors ==
- Elected to the National Academy of Sciences in 1998.
- Elected to the American Academy of Arts and Sciences in 1999.
- Elected to the American Academy of Microbiology (AAM) in 2009.
- American Society for Microbiology (ASM) Abbott-ASM Lifetime Achievement Award in 2011.
- Selman A. Waksman Award in Microbiology in 2015 for a major advance in the field of microbiology.
- 2017 Herbert Tabor Research Award from the American Society for Biochemistry and Molecular Biology.
- Keynote Speaker at the Boston Bacterial Meeting 2017.
- Keynote Speaker at the 6th Molecular Microbiology Meeting at Newcastle University, June, 2019.
- Appointed to be a Vallee Visiting Professor for 2019 by the Vallee Foundation.

== Selected publications ==
- Battesti, A; Hoskins, JR; Tong, S; Milanesio, P; Mann, JM; Kravats, A; Tsegaye, YM; Bougdour, A; Wickner, S; Gottesman, S (December 15, 2013). "Anti-adaptors provide multiple modes for regulation of the RssB adaptor protein". Genes & Development. 27 (24): 2722–35. doi:10.1101/gad.229617.113. PMC 3877760. PMID 24352426.
- Zhang, A; Schu, DJ; Tjaden, BC; Storz, G; Gottesman, S (October 9, 2013). "Mutations in interaction surfaces differentially impact E. coli Hfq association with small RNAs and their mRNA targets". Journal of Molecular Biology. 425 (19): 3678–97. doi:10.1016/j.jmb.2013.01.006. PMC 3640674. PMID 23318956.
- Soper, T; Mandin, P; Majdalani, N; Gottesman, S; Woodson, SA (May 25, 2010). "Positive regulation by small RNAs and the role of Hfq". Proceedings of the National Academy of Sciences of the United States of America. 107 (21): 9602–7. Bibcode:2010PNAS..107.9602S. doi:10.1073/pnas.1004435107. PMC 2906882. PMID 20457943.
- Battesti, A; Majdalani, N; Gottesman, S (2011). "The RpoS-mediated general stress response in Escherichia coli". Annual Review of Microbiology. 65: 189–213. doi:10.1146/annurev-micro-090110-102946. PMC 7356644. PMID 21639793. S2CID 23795368.
- De Lay, N; Gottesman, S (November 2012). "A complex network of small non-coding RNAs regulate motility in Escherichia coli". Molecular Microbiology. 86 (3): 524–38. doi:10.1111/j.1365-2958.2012.08209.x. PMC 7458410. PMID 22925049.
