= Curli =

Proteinaceous extracellular fiber produced by enteric bacteria

Curli secretion channel
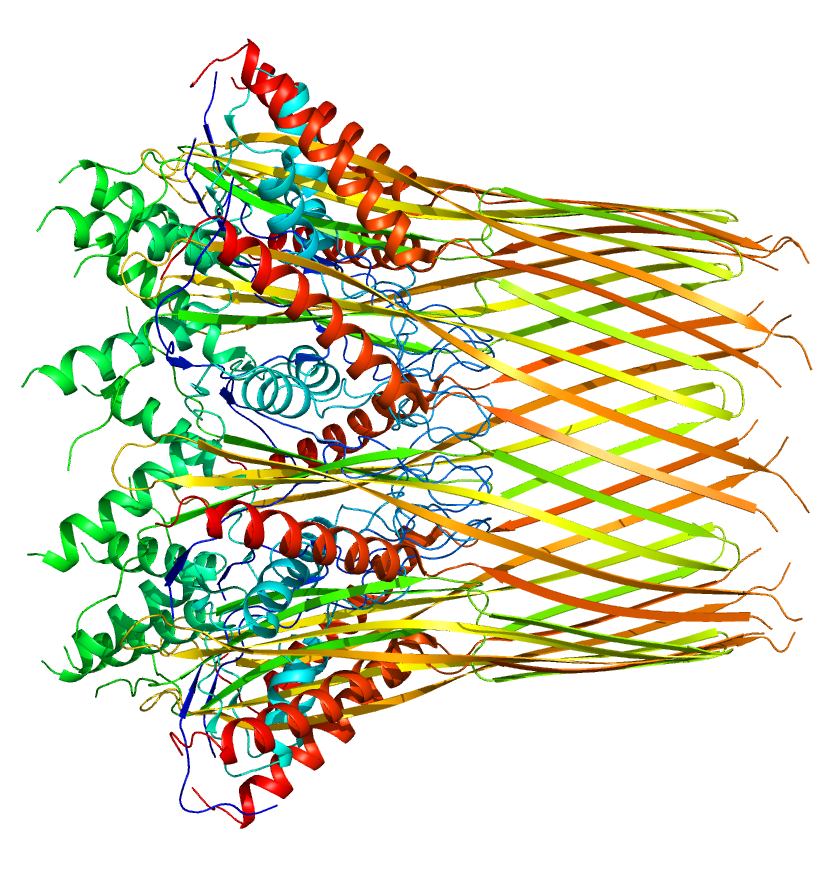

Identifiers
- Organism: Escherichia coli (strain K12), Salmonella spp.
- Symbol: CsgG
- Entrez: 945619
- PDB: 3X2R
- RefSeq (mRNA): NC_000913.3
- RefSeq (Prot): NP_415555.1
- UniProt: P0AEA2

Other data
- Chromosome: Genomic: 1.1 - 1.1 Mb
Search for
- Structures: Swiss-model
- Domains: InterPro

Probiotic-associated therapeutic curli hybrids (PATCH)

The Curli protein is a type of amyloid fiber produced by certain strains of enterobacteria. They are extracellular fibers located on bacteria such as E. coli and Salmonella spp. These fibers serve to promote cell community behavior through biofilm formation in the extracellular matrix. Amyloids are associated with several human neurodegenerative diseases such as Alzheimer's disease, Huntington's disease, Parkinson's disease, and prion diseases. The study of curli may help to understand human diseases thought to arise from improper amyloid fiber formation. The curli pili are generally assembled through the extracellular nucleation precipitation pathway.

== Gene biosynthesis and regulation ==
A convenient way to identify genes important for curli production is by growing curliated bacteria on plates supplemented with Congo red diazo dye, which causes a red shift. Curli fibers, and thus the curli protein, are coded by two divergently-transcribed operons in E. coli: the csgBAC and csgDEFG operons. In total, these operons encode at least seven proteins. The agfBA and agfDEFG operons, which have been identified in Salmonella spp., are homologous to the csgBAC and csgDEFG operons. The csgBAC operon is responsible for the coding the three proteins CsgB, CsgA, and CsgC—all responsible for either the major subunit formation within the curli fiber or the inhibition of it. The csgDEFG operon codes for proteins CsgD, CsgE, CsgF, and CsgG, and is responsible for the assembly, translocation, and regulation of the curli protein.

CsgD is a positive transcriptional regulator of the csgBAC operon, but does not regulate its own expression. The csgBA operon encodes the major structural subunit of curli, CsgA, as well as the nucleator protein, CsgB. Further research still needs to be conducted in order to see what stimulates CsgD expression or activity, but some evidence suggests that its activation is caused by the phosphorylation of an aspartic acid residue of the N-terminal receiver domain. Since CsgD must be present for csgBA promoter activity, it is therefore suggested that regulators of CsgD expression also influence the expression of csgBA.

Many environmental cues play a role in curli gene expression. It has long been believed that bacterial growth at a temperature below 30 °C promotes curli gene expression. However, it is now known that curli expression is strain- and condition-specific. For example, mutations to the CsgD promoter can result in curli expression at 37 °C. Additionally, when there is a lack of salt and nutrients such as nitrogen, phosphate or iron, curli gene expression is stimulated.

== Functions ==
Amyloids have been linked to illnesses such as Alzheimer's, Parkinson's, Huntington's, lupus, among many others. The curli protein is considered a PAMP (Pathogen-associated molecular pattern); its β-sheet structure is recognized in the innate immune system and activates the TLR2 (Toll-Like Receptor 2). This then causes a downstream response by producing a pro-inflammatory response where pro-inflammatory cytokines and chemokines are recruited to initiate the inflammation response.

Curli, however, has additional functions (thus being coined a "functional amyloid") including being a major component in the biofilm generated by gram-negative bacteria such as E. coli and Salmonella spp. These biofilms allow gram-negative bacteria to better colonize in a given environment, protecting them from oxidative stress and dehydration. These biofilms, however, call for much concern. Since these biofilms allow for the bacteria to survive chemical and physical stressors within their environment, not only do they make patients more susceptible to infection when using shared appliances, but curli and other biofilms have been shown to reduce the infected individuals' immune response and antimicrobials. Curli proteins and biofilms alike are very resistant to chemical stressors to a point where stronger pretreatment is required in order for curli to degrade or dissolve in sodium dodecyl sulphate (SDS).

Curli fibers that are created are involved in many different types and functions in the cell such as for cell aggregation, act as adhesive for different proteins to the cell's surface, used in biofilm formation of certain bacteria and contain chemicals for quorum sensing, as well as plays an important role in inflammatory response in individuals. Curli formation must also be heavily regulated as its accumulation leads to amyloid like protein aggregations in the organism which leads to destruction of pathway and interferes with cell signaling.

== Structure ==
The curli protein's main components (subunits) consist of the CsgA and CsgB protein.

=== CsgA ===
CsgA is the major subunit of the curli protein and weighs approximately 13.1 kilodalton. This protein consists of three domains which have a tendency to aggregate and form amyloid fibrils: a single peptide, a 22-amino acid N-terminal sequence (used for secretion), and an amyloid core domain at the C-terminal sequence. The amyloid core domain is composed of 5 repeating (yet not exact) sequences revolving around the sequence: Ser-X_{5}-Gln-X-Gly-X-Gly-Asn-X-Ala-X_{3}-Gln. This repeating sequence is the characteristic subunit that forms its aggregatable β-sheet.

=== CsgB ===
CsgB, also known as the minor subunit, is required for the nucleation and organization of CsgA into a curli fiber on cell surfaces. CsgB has a very similar repeating sequence to that of CsgA with the exception that one of the 5 repeating sequences contains additional amino acids: Lys133, Arg140, Arg14, and Arg151. This change in the final subunit (known as the R5 subunit) is required. Without the presence of the R5 subunit, or the changes within the subunit, CsgA is secreted from the cell in an unpolymerized form and cannot properly form on cell surfaces.

=== CsgC ===
The CsgC subunit was only recently discovered to prevent the aggregation and polymerization of the CsgA protein. Without it, there is a chance for amyloid fibril formation and even cell death. Multiple experiments isolating CsgC away from the CsgA and CsgB subunit caused CsgA to aggregate into fibrils, which may possibly lead to downstream effects as seen in illnesses such as Alzheimer's. The molar ratio required for CsgC to inhibit CsgA is 1:500, meaning only 1 CsgC protein is required to inhibit 500 CsgA proteins from forming amyloid fibril structures. It is hypothesized that CsgC is therefore considered a chaperone since it prevents further CsgA nucleation and allows CsgA to form into its proper structure instead of aggregating.
