= Entericidin =

Bacterial antidote/toxin peptides

Identifiers
- Symbol: Entericidin
- Pfam: PF08085
- Pfam clan: CL0421
- InterPro: IPR012556
- TCDB: 9.B.13
Available protein structures:
- Pfam: structures / ECOD
- PDB: RCSB PDB; PDBe; PDBj
- PDBsum: structure summary

In molecular biology, entericidins are bacterial antidote/toxin peptides. The entericidin locus is activated in the stationary phase of growth under high osmolarity conditions by rho-S and simultaneously repressed by the osmoregulatory EnvZ/OmpR signal transduction pathway. The entericidin locus encodes tandem paralogous genes (ecnAB) and directs the synthesis of two small cell-envelope lipoproteins (entericidin A and entericidin B) which can maintain plasmids in bacterial population by means of post-segregational killing.
