= RpoF =

Gene that encodes the sigma factor sigma-28

RNA polymerase sigma factor FliA

Identifiers
- Organism: Escherichia coli (strain K12)
- Symbol: fliA
- Alt. symbols: flaD, rpoF
- Entrez: 93776231
- Orthologs: NCBI: entry; OMA: entry
- PDB: 6PMI, 6PMJ
- RefSeq (mRNA): NC_000913
- RefSeq (Prot): NP_416432
- UniProt: P0AEM6

Other data
- Chromosome: Genomic: 2 - 2 Mb
Search for
- Structures: Swiss-model
- Domains: InterPro

The gene rpoF (RNA polymerase, flagellum F) encodes the sigma factor sigma-28 (σ28, or RpoF), a protein in Escherichia coli and other species of bacteria. Depending on the bacterial species, this gene may be referred to as sigD or fliA. The protein encoded by this gene has been found to be necessary for flagellum formation.
