= Caroline Harwood =

American microbiologist

- Education: Colby College (BS); Boston University (MS); University of Massachusetts Amherst (PhD)
- Spouse: Everett Peter Greenberg
- Awards: Procter & Gamble Award in Applied and Environmental Microbiology (2010)
- Scientific career
- Fields: Microbiology
- Workplaces: Cornell University; University of Iowa; University of Washington
- Doctoral advisor: Ercole Canale-Parola

Caroline S. Harwood is an American microbiologist who was elected to the National Academy of Sciences in 2009. She is the Professor Gerald and Lyn Grinstein Professor of Microbiology and Associate Vice-Provost for Research at the University of Washington School of Medicine.

== Early life and education ==
Harwood was born to Charles and Barbara Harwood as the eldest of six children, Carrie, Wheezy, Betty, Jane, Kit, and Charlie. She attended Concord Academy, a girl's high school in Concord, Massachusetts. Harwood studied at Colby College in Maine, and then received a master's degree in biology from Boston University. She studied under Ercole Canale-Parola at the University of Massachusetts Amherst, where she received her PhD in microbiology. She finished her post-doctoral studies at Yale University.

== Academic career ==
Harwood held an academic appointment at Cornell University, and she was a professor of microbiology at the University of Iowa from 1988 until 2004. Since 2005, she has been teaching at the University of Washington.

Her research topics include metabolic networks, bacterial signaling, and bioenergy production. Harwood demonstrated that soil bacteria catabolize some of the hardest compounds found in nature, such as lignin components and compounds that cause pollution. She was the head of the project that uncovered the sequence of the genome of Rhodopseudomonas palustris, a bacterium that performs photosynthesis and is capable of heterotrophy and hydrogen production.

In January 2018 Harwood was the senior author in an article published in Nature Microbiology describing the discovery of a previously unknown enzymatic pathway for the natural biological production of methane.

== Honors and awards ==
Harwood is an elected member of the National Academy of Sciences, the American Association for the Advancement of Sciences, and the American Academy of Microbiology. In 2010 Harwood received the Procter & Gamble Award in Applied and Environmental Microbiology.

== Personal life ==
Harwood is married to microbiologist Everett Peter Greenberg, who she frequently collaborates with.
