= CsgD =

Protein in bacteria

CsgD is a transcription and response regulator protein referenced to as the master modulator of bacterial biofilm development. In E. coli cells, CsgD is tasked with aiding the transition from planktonic cell motility to the stationary phase of biofilm formation, in response to environmental growth factors. A transcription analysis assay (happening in vitro) illustrated a heightened decrease in CsgD's DNA-binding capacity when phosphorylated at A.A. D59 of the protein's primary sequence. Therefore, in the protein's active form (unphosphorylated), CsgD is capable of carrying out its normal functions of regulating curli proteins (fimbria) and producing ECM polysaccharides (cellulose). Following a promoter-lacZ fusion assay of CsgD binding to specific target sites on E. coli's genome, two classes of binding targets were identified: group I genes and group II genes. The group I genes, akin to fliE and yhbT, exhibit repressed transcription following their interaction with CsgD, whilst group II genes, including yccT and adrA, illustrated active functionality. Other group I operons that illustrate repressed transcription include fliE and fliEFGH, for motile flagellum formation. Other group II genes, imperative to the transition towards stationary biofilm development, include csgBA, encoding for curli fimbriae, and adrA, encoding for the synthesis of cyclic diguanylate. In this context, c-di-GMP functions as a bacterial secondary messenger, enhancing the production of extracellular cellulose and impeding flagellum production and rotation.
