= Sigma factor =

Protein needed for initiation of transcription in prokaryotes

Sigma70 region 1.1

Identifiers
- Symbol: Sigma70_r1_1
- Pfam: PF03979
- InterPro: IPR007127
Available protein structures:
- PDB: IPR007127 PF03979 (ECOD; PDBsum)
- AlphaFold: IPR007127; PF03979

A sigma factor (σ factor or specificity factor) is a protein needed for initiation of transcription in bacteria. It is a bacterial transcription initiation factor that enables specific binding of RNA polymerase (RNAP) to gene promoters. They are also found in plant chloroplasts as a part of the bacteria-like plastid-encoded polymerase (PEP). It is homologous to archaeal transcription factor B and to eukaryotic factor TFIIB. The specific sigma factor used to initiate transcription of a given gene will vary, depending on the gene and on the environmental signals needed to initiate transcription of that gene. Selection of promoters by RNA polymerase is dependent on the sigma factor that associates with it.

The sigma factor, together with RNA polymerase, is known as the RNA polymerase holoenzyme. Every molecule of RNA polymerase holoenzyme contains exactly one sigma factor subunit, which in the model bacterium Escherichia coli is one of the seven listed below. The number of sigma factors varies among bacterial species; for example, E. coli has seven sigma factors. Sigma factors are distinguished by their characteristic molecular weights. For example, σ^{70} is the sigma factor with a molecular weight of 70 kDa.

The sigma factor in the RNA polymerase holoenzyme complex is required for the initiation of transcription, although once that stage is finished, the sigma factor dissociates from the complex and the RNAP continues elongation on its own.

== Specialized sigma factors ==
Different sigma factors are utilized under different environmental conditions. These specialized sigma factors bind the promoters of genes appropriate to the environmental conditions, increasing the transcription of those genes.

Sigma factors in E. coli:

- σ^{70}(RpoD) – σ^{A} – the "housekeeping" sigma factor or also called as primary sigma factor (Group 1), transcribes most genes in growing cells. Every cell has a "housekeeping" sigma factor that keeps essential genes and pathways operating. In the case of E. coli and other gram-negative rod-shaped bacteria, the "housekeeping" sigma factor is σ^{70}. Genes recognized by σ^{70} all contain similar promoter consensus sequences consisting of two parts. Relative to the DNA base corresponding to the start of the RNA transcript, the consensus promoter sequences are characteristically centered at 10 and 35 nucleotides before the start of transcription (−10 and −35).
- σ^{19} (FecI) – the ferric citrate sigma factor, regulates the fec gene for iron transport and metabolism
- σ^{24} (RpoE) – extreme heat stress response and the extracellular proteins sigma factor
- σ^{28} (RpoF/FliA) – the flagellar synthesis and chemotaxis sigma factor
- σ^{32} (RpoH) – the heat shock sigma factor, turned on when the bacteria are exposed to heat. Due to the higher expression, the factor will bind with a high probability to the polymerase-core-enzyme. Doing so, other heatshock proteins are expressed, which enable the cell to survive higher temperatures. Some of the enzymes that are expressed upon activation of σ^{32} are chaperones, proteases and DNA-repair enzymes.
- σ^{38} (RpoS) – the starvation/stationary phase sigma factor
- σ^{54} (RpoN) – the nitrogen-limitation sigma factor

There are also anti-sigma factors that inhibit the function of sigma factors and anti-anti-sigma factors that restore sigma factor function.

== Structure ==
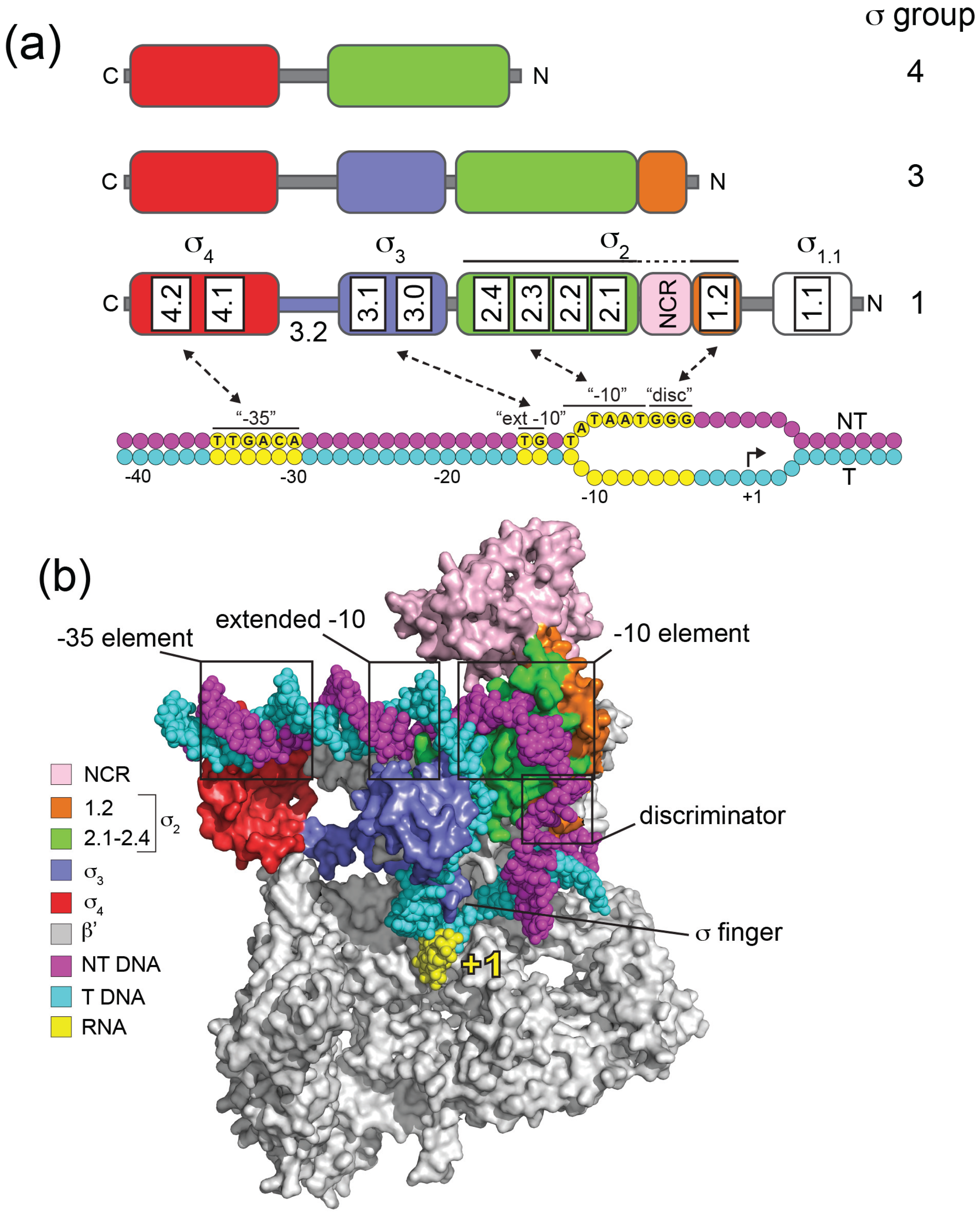
Domain organization, promoter recognition and structural organization of the σ^{70} family. (a) The domain organization of σ factors from Groups 1, 3 and 4 are illustrated above σ^{70} consensus E. coli promoter DNA. (b) Organization of E. coli σ70 in an RNA polymerase transcription initiation complex. (PDB 4YLN).

By sequence similarity, most sigma factors are σ^{70}-like (InterPro: IPR000943). They have four main regions (domains) that are generally conserved:

N-terminus --------------------- C-terminus
             1.1    2    3    4

The regions are further subdivided. For example, region 2 includes 1.2 and 2.1 through 2.4.

Domain 1.1 is found only in "primary sigma factors" (RpoD, RpoS in E.coli; "Group 1"). It is involved in ensuring the sigma factor will only bind the promoter when it is complexed with the RNA polymerase. Domains 2-4 each interact with specific promoter elements and with RNAP. Region 2.4 recognizes and binds to the promoter −10 element (called the "Pribnow box"). Region 4.2 recognizes and binds to the promoter −35 element.

Not every sigma factor of the σ^{70} family contains all the domains. Group 2, which includes RpoS, is very similar to Group 1 but lacks domain 1. Group 3 also lacks domain 1, and includes σ^{28}. Group 4, also known as the Extracytoplasmic Function (ECF) group, lack both σ1.1 and σ3. RpoE is a member.

Other known sigma factors are of the σ^{54}/RpoN (InterPro: IPR000394) type. They are functional sigma factors, but they have significantly different primary amino acid sequences.

Protein domain infoboxes

Sigma70 region 1.2
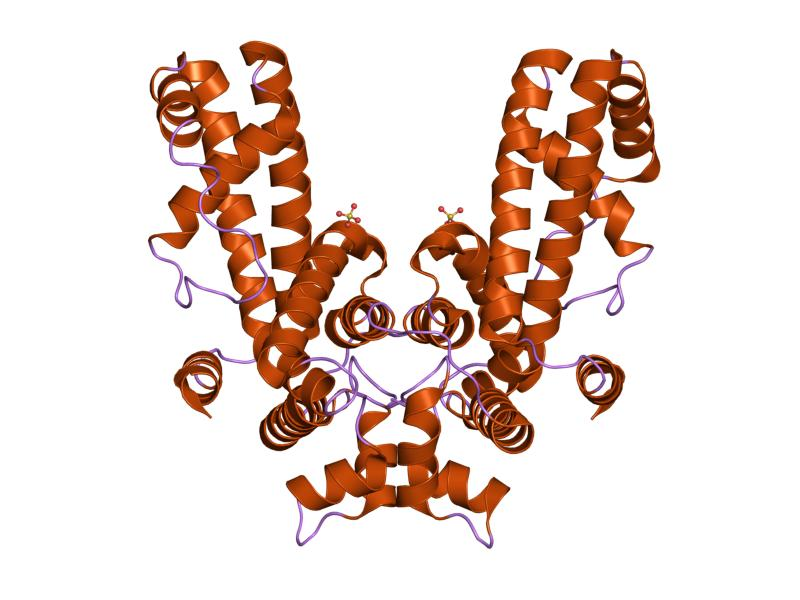
- Crystal structure of Thermus aquaticus RNA polymerase sigma subunit fragment containing regions 1.2 to 3.1

Identifiers
- Symbol: Sigma70_r1_2
- Pfam: PF00140
- InterPro: IPR009042
- PROSITE: PDOC00592
- SCOP2: 1sig / SCOPe / SUPFAM
Available protein structures:
- PDB: IPR009042 PF00140 (ECOD; PDBsum)
- AlphaFold: IPR009042; PF00140

Sigma70 region 2
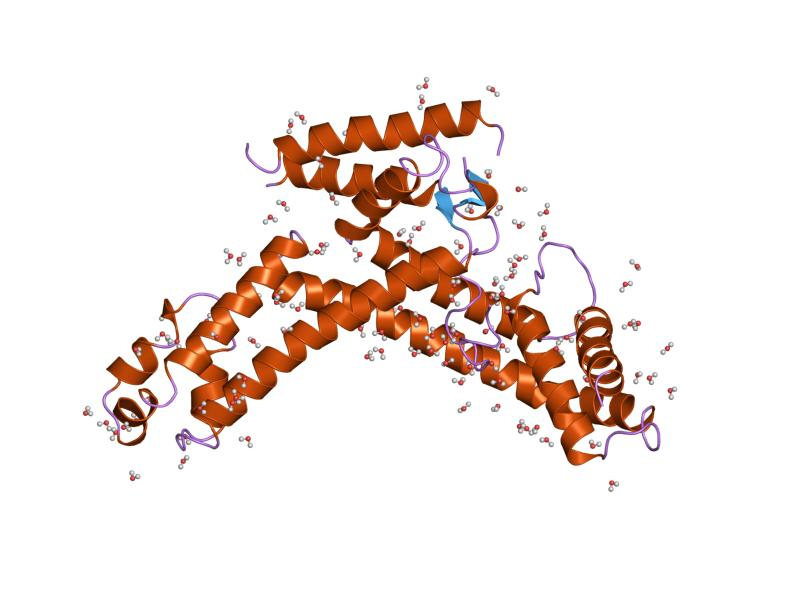
- Crystal structure of a sigma70 subunit fragment from Escherichia coli RNA polymerase

Identifiers
- Symbol: Sigma70_r2
- Pfam: PF04542
- Pfam clan: CL0123
- InterPro: IPR007627
- PROSITE: PDOC00592
- SCOP2: 1sig / SCOPe / SUPFAM
Available protein structures:
- PDB: IPR007627 PF04542 (ECOD; PDBsum)
- AlphaFold: IPR007627; PF04542

Sigma70 region 3
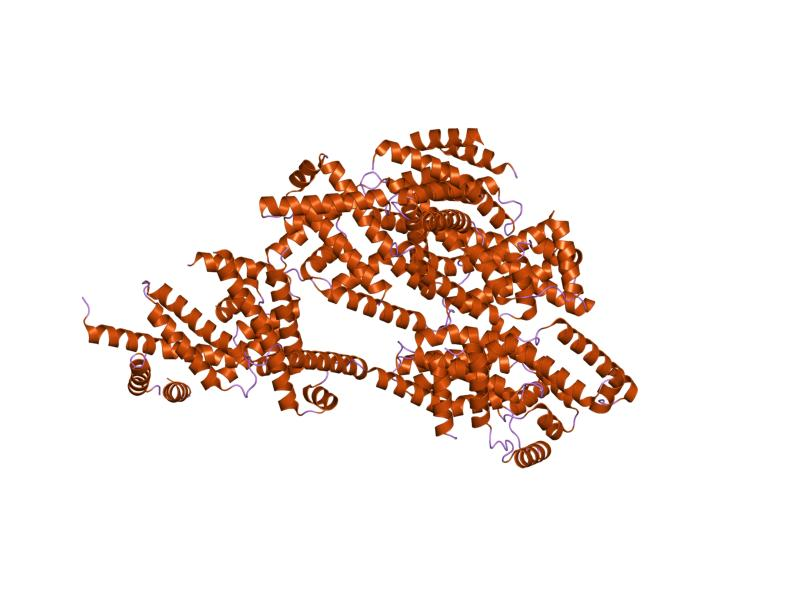
- Solution structure of sigma70 region 3 from Thermotoga maritima

Identifiers
- Symbol: Sigma70_r3
- Pfam: PF04539
- Pfam clan: CL0123
- InterPro: IPR007624
- SCOP2: 1ku2 / SCOPe / SUPFAM
Available protein structures:
- PDB: IPR007624 PF04539 (ECOD; PDBsum)
- AlphaFold: IPR007624; PF04539

Sigma70 region 4
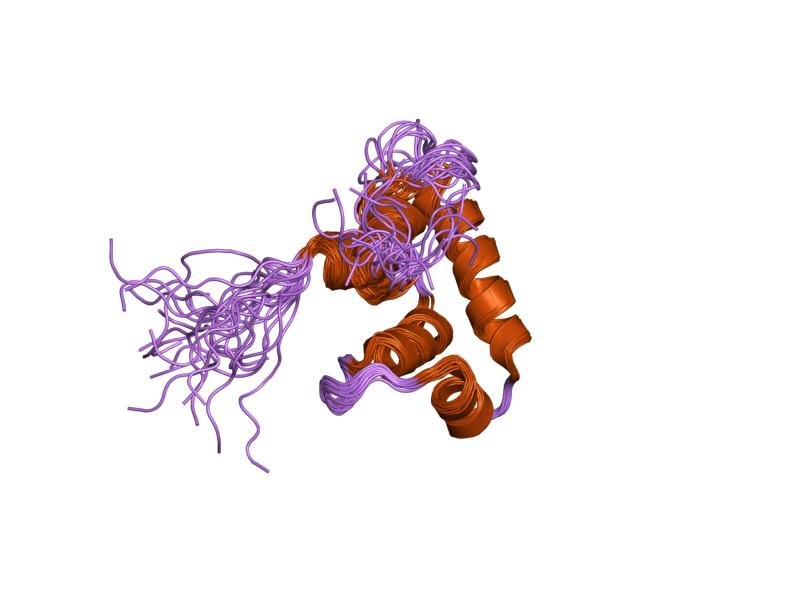
- Solution structure of sigma70 region 4 from Thermotoga maritima

Identifiers
- Symbol: Sigma70_r4
- Pfam: PF04545
- Pfam clan: CL0123
- InterPro: IPR007630
- SCOP2: 1or7 / SCOPe / SUPFAM
Available protein structures:
- PDB: IPR007630 PF04545 (ECOD; PDBsum)
- AlphaFold: IPR007630; PF04545

Sigma70 region 4.2
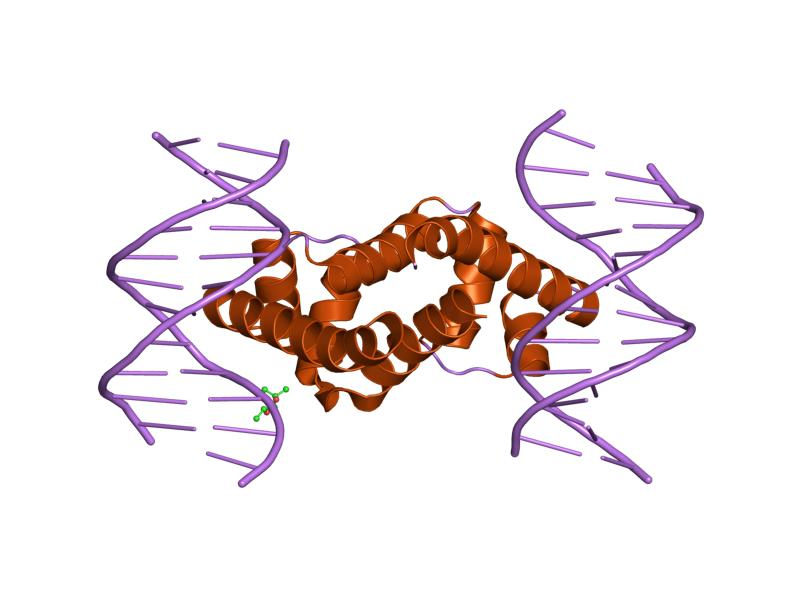
- Crystal structure of Escherichia coli sigma70 region 4 bound to its -35 element DNA

Identifiers
- Symbol: Sigma70_r4_2
- Pfam: PF08281
- Pfam clan: CL0123
- InterPro: IPR013249
- SCOP2: 1or7 / SCOPe / SUPFAM
Available protein structures:
- PDB: IPR013249 PF08281 (ECOD; PDBsum)
- AlphaFold: IPR013249; PF08281

== Retention during transcription elongation ==
The core RNA polymerase (consisting of 2 alpha (α), 1 beta (β), 1 beta-prime (β'), and 1 omega (ω) subunits) binds a sigma factor to form a complex called the RNA polymerase holoenzyme. It was previously believed that the RNA polymerase holoenzyme initiates transcription, while the core RNA polymerase alone synthesizes RNA. Thus, the accepted view was that sigma factor must dissociate upon transition from transcription initiation to transcription elongation (this transition is called "promoter escape"). This view was based on analysis of purified complexes of RNA polymerase stalled at initiation and at elongation. Finally, structural models of RNA polymerase complexes predicted that, as the growing RNA product becomes longer than ~15 nucleotides, sigma must be "pushed out" of the holoenzyme, since there is a steric clash between RNA and a sigma domain. However, σ^{70} can remain attached in complex with the core RNA polymerase in early elongation and sometimes throughout elongation. Indeed, the phenomenon of promoter-proximal pausing indicates that sigma plays roles during early elongation. All studies are consistent with the assumption that promoter escape reduces the lifetime of the sigma-core interaction from very long at initiation (too long to be measured in a typical biochemical experiment) to a shorter, measurable lifetime upon transition to elongation.

== Sigma cycle ==
It had long been thought that the sigma factor obligatorily leaves the core enzyme once it has initiated transcription, allowing it to link to another core enzyme and initiate transcription at another site. Thus, the sigma factor would cycle from one core to another. However, fluorescence resonance energy transfer was used to show that the sigma factor does not obligatorily leave the core. Instead, it changes its binding with the core during initiation and elongation. Therefore, the sigma factor cycles between a strongly bound state during initiation and a weakly bound state during elongation.

== Sigma factor competition ==
The number of RNAPs in bacterial cells (e.g., E. coli) have been shown to be smaller than the number of sigma factors. Consequently, if a certain sigma factor is overexpressed, not only will it increase the expression levels of genes whose promoters have preference for that sigma factor, but it will also reduce the probability that genes with promoters with preference for other sigma factors will be expressed.

Meanwhile, transcription initiation has two major rate limiting steps: the closed and the open complex formation. However, only the dynamics of the first step depends on the concentration of sigma factors. Interestingly, the faster the closed complex formation relative to the open complex formation, the less responsive is a promoter to changes in sigma factors' concentration (see for a model and empirical data of this phenomenon).

== Genes with dual sigma factor preference ==
While most genes of E. coli can be recognized by an RNAP with one and only one type of sigma factor (e.g. sigma 70), a few genes (~ 5%) have what is called a "dual sigma factor preference", that is, they can respond to two different sigma factors, as reported in RegulonDB. The most common ones are those promoters that can respond to both sigma 70 and to sigma 38 (illustrated in the figure). Studies of the dynamics of these genes showed that when the cells enter stationary growth they are almost as induced as those genes that have preference for σ38 alone. This induction level was shown to be predictable from their promoter sequence. A model of their dynamics is shown in the figure. In the future, these promoters may become useful tools in synthetic genetic constructs in E. coli.

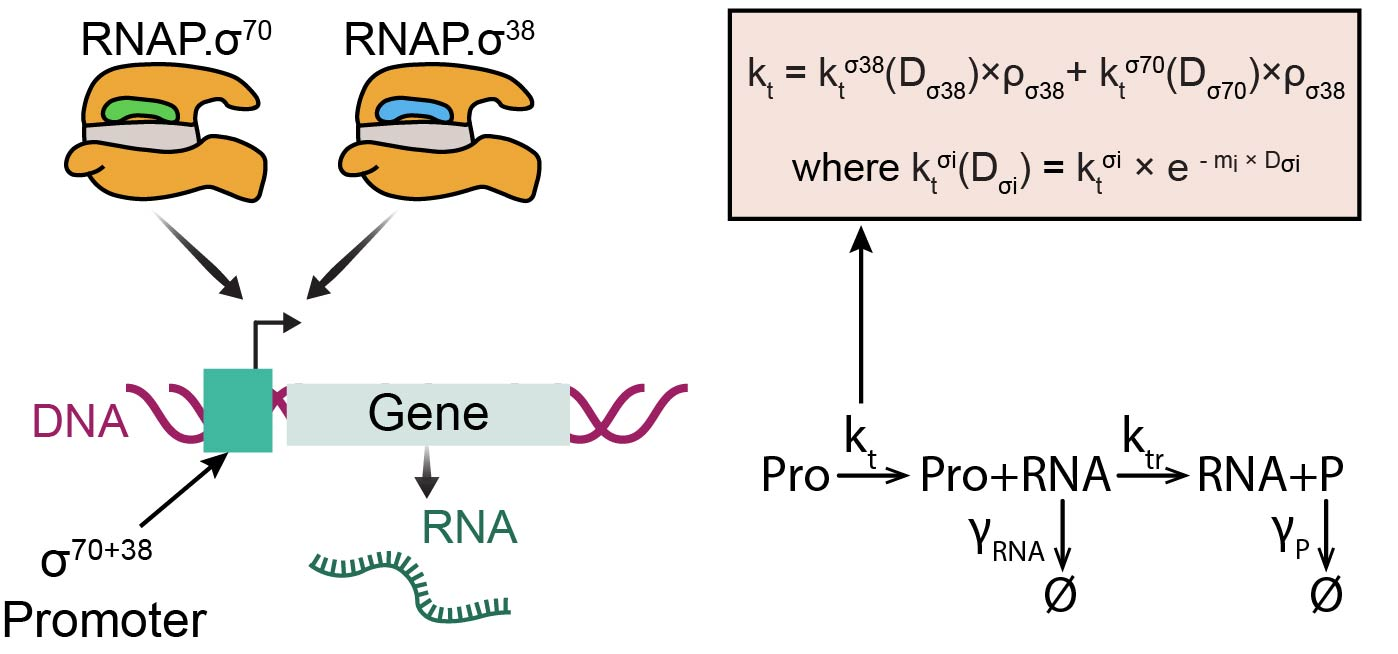
Left: illustration of genes whose promoters can be recognized by both sigma 70 (green) and sigma 38 (blue). Shown are the RNA polymerases, carrying the two different sigma factors, and either of them can bind to the promoter region (grey rectangle). Right: Model proposed in [15] of these genes. The model consists of a two-step process of gene expression (transcription followed by translation). The rate constant from transcription (k_{t}) accounts for the possibility of binding by either RNAP (those carrying sigma 70, and those carrying sigma 38). The model also includes translation (rate constant kt), and RNA and protein degradation to "nothing" represented by the "slashed zero glyph".

== See also ==
- Ekkehard Bautz
