= Hfq protein =

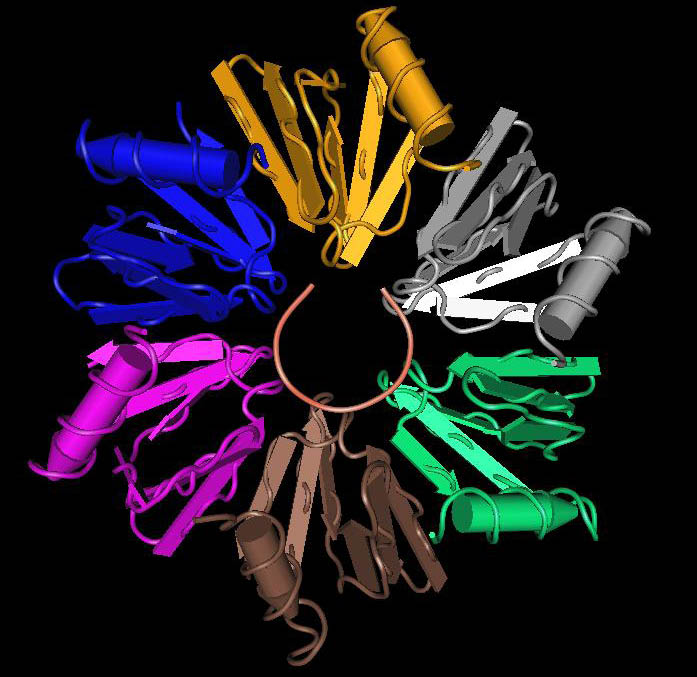
Hfq protein with a bound sRNA.

The Hfq protein (also known as HF-I protein) encoded by the hfq gene was discovered in 1968 as an Escherichia coli host factor that was essential for replication of the bacteriophage Qβ. It is now clear that Hfq is an abundant bacterial RNA binding protein which has many important physiological roles that are usually mediated by interacting with Hfq binding sRNA.

In E. coli, Hfq mutants show multiple stress response-related phenotypes. The Hfq protein is now known to regulate the translation of two major stress transcription factors ( σS (RpoS) and σE (RpoE) ) in Enterobacteria. It also regulates sRNA in Vibrio cholerae, a specific example being MicX sRNA. In Salmonella typhimurium, Hfq has been shown to be an essential virulence factor as its deletion attenuates the ability of S.typhimurium to invade epithelial cells, secrete virulence factors or survive in cultured macrophages. In Salmonella, Hfq deletion mutants are also non-motile and exhibit chronic activation of the sigma-mediated envelope stress response. A CLIP-Seq study of Hfq in Salmonella has revealed 640 binding sites across the Salmonella transcriptome. The majority of these binding sites was found in mRNAs and sRNAs. In Photorhabdus luminescens, a deletion of the hfq gene causes loss of secondary metabolite production.

Hfq mediates its pleiotropic effects through several mechanisms. It interacts with regulatory sRNA and facilitates their antisense interaction with their targets. It also acts independently to modulate mRNA decay (directing mRNA transcripts for degradation) and acts as a repressor of mRNA translation. Genomic SELEX has been used to show that Hfq-binding RNAs are enriched in the sequence motif 5'-AAYAAYAA-3'. Hfq was also found to act on ribosome biogenesis in E. coli, specifically on the 30S subunit. Hfq mutants accumulate higher levels of immature small ribosomal subunits and decreased translation accuracy. This function on the bacterial ribosome could also account for the pleiotropic effect typical of Hfq deletion strains.

Electron microscopy imaging reveals that, in addition to the expected localization of this protein in cytoplasmic regions and in the nucleoid, an important fraction of Hfq is located in close proximity to the membrane.

== Crystallographic structures ==
Six crystallographic structures of four different Hfq proteins have been published so far; E. coli Hfq (PDB: 1HK9), P. aeruginosa Hfq in a low salt condition (1U1S) and a high salt condition (1U1T), Hfq from S. aureus with bound RNA (1KQ2) and without (1KQ1), and the Hfq(-like) protein from M. jannaschii (2QTX).

All six structures confirm the hexameric ring-shape of a Hfq protein complex.

== See also ==
- RNA-OUT
