= U-107-class submarine =

Planned Austro-Hungarian Navy submarines during WWI

Class overview
- Builders: Ganz Danubius, Fiume
- Operators: Austro-Hungarian Navy
- Preceded by: U-101-class submarine
- Built: 1917–1918
- Completed: 0
- Cancelled: 6
- Scrapped: 2
- Preserved: 0

General characteristics
- Type: submarine
- Displacement: 428 t (472 short tons) surfaced; 620 t (680 short tons) submerged
- Length: 228 ft (69 m)
- Beam: 23 ft (7.0 m)
- Draft: unknown
- Propulsion: 2 × shaft; 2 × diesel engines, 2,300 bhp (1,700 kW) total; 2 × electric motors, 1,260 shp (940 kW) total
- Speed: unknown
- Complement: 36
- Armament: 5 × 45 cm (17.7 in) torpedo tubes (4 bow, 1 stern); 10 torpedoes; 1 × 10 cm/35 (3.9 in) deck gun

The U-107 class was a class of submarines or U-boats planned for the Austro-Hungarian Navy (German: Kaiserliche und Königliche Kriegsmarine or K.u.K. Kriegsmarine) during World War I. The design was similar to the Germaniawerft UD design which had formed the basis for the Austro-Hungarian Navy's U-7-class submarines. Two boats (U-107 and U-108) were laid down in early 1918 by Ganz Danubius in Fiume, but neither was launched or completed before the end of the war. No other submarines of the class were ever laid down.

== Design ==
The design for the U-107 class was similar to the Germaniawerft UD design, which had formed the basis of the Austro-Hungarian U-7-class boats that had been ordered in 1913 and had been sold to the Imperial German Navy in the early stages of World War I.

According to Conway's All the World's Fighting Ships 1906–1921, the specifications of the U-107 class are very unclear. The displacement for the boats was to be 428 t (472 short tons) surfaced and 620 t (680 short tons) submerged. The boats were to be 228 feet (69 m) long with a beam of 23 feet (7.0 m), but of unknown draft. For propulsion, the design featured two shafts, with twin diesel engines of 2,300 bhp (1,700 kW) (total) for surface running, and twin electric motors of 1,260 shp (940 kW) (total) for submerged travel. The speed expected for the boats is not reported in Conway's. The U-107 class boats were designed for a crew of 36 men.

The U-107 design called for five 45 cm (17.7 in) torpedo tubes—four bow tubes and one stern tube—and may have been able to carry as many as twelve torpedoes. The design also specified a 10 cm/35 (3.9 in) deck gun.

== Construction ==
The number of planned boats is reported by Conway's as 35, numbered from U-107 to U-141. The book, however, provides no explanation of the apparent overlap of U-118 through U-120, which are also reported as assigned to three U-101-class submarines. Regardless of the number planned, Conway's reports only four boats had any sort of construction activity. U-107 and U-108 were laid down by Ganz Danubius in Fiume in March and May 1918.

The boats were begun late in the war when shortages of skilled shipyard workers and materials were slowing construction of other boats under construction. As a result, none of the first four boats was ever launched or completed before the end of the war. U-107 was 35% complete at war's end, while U-108 was only 30% complete, respectively. Ganz Danubius had also begun stockpiling materials for U-109 and U-110 but had not started on these two boats. Although there is no specific mention of the fates of the pair of incomplete boats of the U-107 class, incomplete boats from other late-war classes were scrapped 1919–1920.

== Bibliography ==
- Baumgartner, Lothar; Erwin Sieche (1999). Die Schiffe der k.(u.)k. Kriegsmarine im Bild = Austro-Hungarian warships in photographs (in German). Wien: Verlagsbuchhandlung Stöhr. ISBN 978-3-901208-25-6. OCLC 43596931.
- Gardiner, Robert; Gray, Randal, eds. (1985). Conway's All the World's Fighting Ships 1906–1921. Annapolis, Maryland: Naval Institute Press. ISBN 978-0-87021-907-8. OCLC 12119866.
