= U-48-class submarine =

Planned Austro-Hungarian Navy submarines during WWI

Class overview
- Builders: Cantiere Navale Triestino, Pola (4)
- Operators: Austro-Hungarian Navy
- Preceded by: U-43-class submarine
- Succeeded by: U-50-class submarine
- Built: 1916–1918
- Planned: 4
- Completed: 0
- Canceled: 2
- Scrapped: 2
- Preserved: 0

General characteristics
- Type: submarine
- Displacement: 818 t (902 short tons) surfaced; 1,184 t (1,305 short tons) submerged
- Length: 240 ft 4 in (73.25 m)
- Beam: 21 ft 11 in (6.68 m)
- Draft: 10 ft 10 in (3.30 m)
- Propulsion: 2 × shaft; 2 × diesel engines, 2,400 bhp (1,800 kW) total; 2 × electric motors, 1,200 shp (890 kW) total
- Speed: 16.25 knots (30.10 km/h) surfaced; 8.5 knots (16 km/h) submerged
- Complement: 32
- Armament: 6 × 45 cm (17.7 in) torpedo tubes (4 bow, 2 stern); 9 torpedoes; 2 × 90 mm/35 (3.5 in) or 120 mm/35 (4.7 in) deck guns

The U-48 class was a class of four submarines or U-boats planned for the Austro-Hungarian Navy (German: Kaiserliche und Königliche Kriegsmarine or German: K.u.K. Kriegsmarine) during World War I. The design of the boats was based on plans purchased from the German firm AG Weser in January 1916. The Navy authorized Cantiere Navale Triestino to begin construction of the submarines in Pola in September 1916. Only two of the planned four boats were laid down, but neither of them was launched or completed. Both incomplete submarines were scrapped after the war ended.

== Design ==
Austria-Hungary's U-boat fleet was largely obsolete at the outbreak of World War I, and over the first two years of the war the Austro-Hungarian Navy focused its efforts on building a U-boat fleet for local defense within the Adriatic. With boats to fill that need either under construction or purchased from Germany, efforts were focused on building submarines for operation in the wider Mediterranean, outside the Adriatic.

In January 1916 Cantiere Navale Triestino (CNT) purchased plans for an 800-tonne (880-short-ton) submarine from the German firm AG Weser of Bremen. Austro-Hungarian Navy modifications to the plans resulted in a submarine that displaced 818 t (902 short tons) surfaced and 1,184 t (1,305 short tons) submerged. The boats were to be 240 feet 4 inches (73.25 m) long with a beam of 21 feet 11 inches (6.68 m) and a draft of 10 feet 10 inches (3.30 m). For propulsion, the design featured two shafts, with twin diesel engines of 2,400 bhp (1,800 kW) (total) for surface running at up to 16.25 knots (30.10 km/h), and twin electric motors of 1,200 shp (890 kW) (total) for submerged travel at up to 8.5 knots (15.7 km/h). The U-48 class boats were designed for a crew of 32 men.

The U-48 design called for six 45 cm (17.7 in) torpedo tubes—four bow tubes and two stern tubes—and carried a complement of nine torpedoes. The original design specified two 90 mm/35 (3.5 in) deck guns, which were superseded by two 120 mm/35 (4.7 in) deck guns in plans for the third and fourth boats.

== Construction ==
In September 1916, Cantiere Navale Triestino (CNT) received authorization to build two boats of the class, U-48 and U-49, with the proviso that the boats be built in Budapest with final assembly at the Pola Navy Yard. (Note: The main CNT shipyards at Monfalcone had been overrun by the Italian Army, causing CNT to set up shop in the navy yard at Pola.) These first two boats, which comprised one-third of the six submarines under construction in 1916, (Note: The other four boats were U-50 and U-51 of the U-50 class and U-52 and U-53 of the U-52 class. See: Gardiner, p. 341.) were followed by orders for U-58 and U-59 before the war's end.

Although CNT had secured fully complete plans from Weser, the Austro-Hungarian design modifications delayed the start of construction. Additional changes after construction had begun slowed the boats' progress. Compounding this were shortages of both material and skilled shipyard workers, further slowing construction. As a result, neither of the first two boats was ever launched, much less completed, and the second pair was cancelled before either was laid down. U-48 was 70% complete at the war's end, while U-49 was only 55% complete. Both boats were scrapped in place in 1920.

== Bibliography ==
- Baumgartner, Lothar; Erwin Sieche (1999). Die Schiffe der k.(u.)k. Kriegsmarine im Bild = Austro-Hungarian warships in photographs (in German). Wien: Verlagsbuchhandlung Stöhr. ISBN 978-3-901208-25-6. OCLC 43596931.
- Gardiner, Robert; Gray, Randal, eds. (1985). Conway's All the World's Fighting Ships 1906–1921. Annapolis, Maryland: Naval Institute Press. ISBN 978-0-87021-907-8. OCLC 12119866.
