= U-50-class submarine =

Planned Austro-Hungarian Navy submarines during WWI

Class overview
- Builders: Ganz Danubius, Fiume
- Operators: Austro-Hungarian Navy
- Preceded by: U-48-class submarine
- Succeeded by: U-52-class submarine
- Built: 1916–1918
- Planned: 4
- Completed: 0
- Canceled: 2
- Scrapped: 2
- Preserved: 0

General characteristics
- Type: submarine
- Displacement: 840 t (930 short tons) surfaced; 1,100 t (1,200 short tons) submerged
- Length: 241 ft (73 m)
- Beam: 20 ft 8 in (6.30 m)
- Draft: 12 ft 11 in (3.94 m)
- Propulsion: 2 × shaft; 2 × diesel engines, 2,300 bhp (1,700 kW) total; 2 × electric motors, 1,200 shp (890 kW) total
- Speed: 16.5 knots (30.6 km/h) surfaced; 9 knots (17 km/h) submerged
- Complement: 33
- Armament: 6 × 45 cm (17.7 in) torpedo tubes (4 bow, 2 stern); 9 torpedoes; 2 × 10 cm/35 (3.9 in) or 120 mm/35 (4.7 in) deck guns

The U-50 class was a class of four ocean-going submarines or U-boats planned for the Austro-Hungarian Navy (German: Kaiserliche und Königliche Kriegsmarine or K.u.K. Kriegsmarine) during World War I. The design of the boats was based on the Project 835 design purchased from the German firm of Germaniawerft in July 1915. The Navy authorized Ganz Danubius to begin construction of the submarines in Fiume in February 1916. Only two of the planned four boats were laid down, but neither were ever launched or completed. The two incomplete submarines were scrapped after the war ended.

== Design ==
Austria-Hungary's U-boat fleet was largely obsolete at the outbreak of World War I, and, over the first two years of the war, the Austro-Hungarian Navy focused its efforts on building a U-boat fleet for local defense within the Adriatic. With boats to fill that need either under construction or purchased from Germany, efforts were focused on building ocean-going submarines for operation in the wider Mediterranean, outside the Adriatic.

To that end, the Austro-Hungarian Navy purchased plans for the Germaniawerft Project 835 design on 11 July 1915 in order to build under license in Austria-Hungary. The plans called for a submarine that displaced 840 t (930 short tons) surfaced and 1,100 t (1,200 short tons) submerged. The boats were to be about 241 feet (73 m) long with a beam of 20 feet 8 inches (6.30 m) and a draft of 12 feet 11 inches (3.94 m). For propulsion, the design featured two shafts, with twin diesel engines of 2,300 bhp (1,700 kW) (total) for surface running at up to 16.5 knots (30.6 km/h), and twin electric motors of 1,200 shp (890 kW) (total) for submerged travel at up to 9 knots (16.7 km/h). The U-50 class boats were designed for a crew of 33 men.

The U-50 design called for six 45 cm (17.7 in) torpedo tubes—four bow tubes and two stern tubes—and carried a complement of nine torpedoes. The original design specified two 10 cm/35 (3.9 in) deck guns, which were superseded by two 120 mm/35 (4.7 in) deck guns in plans for the third and fourth boats.

== Construction ==
On 7 February 1916, Ganz Danubius of Fiume received authorization to build two boats of the class, U-50 and U-51. These first two boats, which comprised one-third of the six ocean-going submarines under construction in 1916, (Note: The other four boats were U-48 and U-49 of the U-48 class and U-52 and U-53 of the U-52 class. See: Gardiner, p. 341.) were followed by orders for U-56 and U-57 in September 1918.

Shortages of skilled shipyard workers and materials slowed construction of the boats, and as a result, neither of the first two boats was ever launched, much less completed. The second pair was cancelled before either was laid down. U-50 was 90% complete at war's end, while U-51 was only 60% complete. Both boats had been scrapped in place in 1920.

== Bibliography ==
- Baumgartner, Lothar; Erwin Sieche (1999). Die Schiffe der k.(u.)k. Kriegsmarine im Bild = Austro-Hungarian warships in photographs (in German). Wien: Verlagsbuchhandlung Stöhr. ISBN 978-3-901208-25-6. OCLC 43596931.
- Gardiner, Robert; Gray, Randal, eds. (1985). Conway's All the World's Fighting Ships 1906–1921. Annapolis, Maryland: Naval Institute Press. ISBN 978-0-87021-907-8. OCLC 12119866.
