= U-101-class submarine =

Planned Austro-Hungarian Navy submarines during WWI

Class overview
- Builders: Austriawerft, Trieste
- Operators: Austro-Hungarian Navy
- Preceded by: U-52-class submarine
- Succeeded by: U-107-class submarine
- Built: 1917–1918
- Planned: 9
- Completed: 0
- Canceled: 6
- Scrapped: 3
- Preserved: 0

General characteristics
- Type: submarine
- Displacement: 428 t (472 short tons) surfaced; 620 t (680 short tons) submerged
- Length: 175 ft 6 in (53.49 m)
- Beam: 19 ft (5.8 m)
- Draft: 11 ft 10 in (3.61 m)
- Propulsion: 2 × shaft; 2 × diesel engines, 1,060 bhp (790 kW) total; 2 × electric motors, 788 shp (588 kW) total
- Speed: 13.25 knots (24.54 km/h) surfaced; 8.25 knots (15 km/h) submerged
- Complement: 26
- Armament: 5 × 45 cm (17.7 in) torpedo tubes (4 bow, 1 stern); 10 torpedoes; 1 × 10 cm/35 (3.9 in) deck gun; 1 × 8 mm (.323 cal) machine gun

The U-101 class was a class of nine submarines or U-boats planned for the Austro-Hungarian Navy (German: Kaiserliche und Königliche Kriegsmarine or K.u.K. Kriegsmarine) during World War I. The class was based on the Type 1916 S 1 design from Ungarische Unterseebotsbau AG. The first three boats were laid down in late 1917 and early 1918 by Austriawerft in Trieste, but none were launched or completed before the end of the war. None of the other six submarines were ever laid down.

== Design ==
Austria-Hungary's U-boat fleet was largely obsolete at the outbreak of World War I, and over the first two years of the war the Austro-Hungarian Navy focused its efforts on building a U-boat fleet for local defense within the Adriatic. Beginning in 1916, the Navy began building larger, ocean-going vessels for operation in the wider Mediterranean, outside the Adriatic. With six of the larger submarines under construction, the Navy considered either building German Type UB III submarines under license or implementing the Type 1916 S 1 design submitted by Ungarische Unterseebotsbau AG (UBAG) of Fiume.

The U-101 class was based on the UBAG design, which called for a boat that displaced 428 t (472 short tons) surfaced and 620 t (680 short tons) submerged. The boats were to be 175 feet 6 inches (53.49 m) long with a beam of 19 feet (5.8 m) and a draft of 11 feet 10 inches (3.61 m). For propulsion, the design featured two shafts, with twin diesel engines of 1,060 bhp (790 kW) (total) for surface running at up to 13.25 knots (24.54 km/h), and twin electric motors of 788 shp (588 kW) (total) for submerged travel at up to 8.25 knots (15.3 km/h). The U-101 class boats were designed for a crew of 26 men.

The U-101 design called for five 45 cm (17.7 in) torpedo tubes—four bow tubes and one stern tube—and a complement of nine torpedoes. The original design specified a single 10 cm/35 (3.9 in) deck gun supplemented with an 8 mm (0.31 in) machine gun.

== Construction ==
The Austro-Hungarian Navy authorized a total of nine U-101 class submarines, six numbered sequentially from U-101 to U-106, and another three, U-118 to U-120. Upon completion of the first six U-101 boats, the Navy intended to scrap its oldest six boats, U-1 to U-6, and drop the first two digits from the new boats so that, for example, U-101 would become the new U-1. In late 1917 and early 1918 the first three boats, U-101 to U-103, were laid down by Austriawerft at Trieste. (Note: Austriawerft was the new, more-"patriotic" wartime name for Stabilimento Tecnico Triestino. See: Baumgartner and Sieche, as excerpted here (reprinted and translated into English by Sieche). Retrieved 2 December 2008.)

The boats were begun late in the war when shortages of skilled shipyard workers and materials were slowing construction of other boats. As a result, none of the first three boats were ever launched, much less completed, and the rest were cancelled before any were laid down. U-101 was 47% complete at war's end, while U-102 and U-103 were only 30% and 10% complete, respectively. Although there is no specific mention of the fates of the three incomplete boats of the U-101 class, incomplete boats from other late-war classes were scrapped in 1919 and 1920.

== Bibliography ==
- Baumgartner, Lothar; Erwin Sieche (1999). Die Schiffe der k.(u.)k. Kriegsmarine im Bild = Austro-Hungarian warships in photographs (in German). Wien: Verlagsbuchhandlung Stöhr. ISBN 978-3-901208-25-6. OCLC 43596931.
- Gardiner, Robert; Gray, Randal, eds. (1985). Conway's All the World's Fighting Ships 1906–1921. Annapolis, Maryland: Naval Institute Press. ISBN 978-0-87021-907-8. OCLC 12119866.
