= CRISPR-associated transposons =

CRISPR-associated transposons or CASTs are mobile genetic elements (MGEs) that have evolved to make use of minimal CRISPR systems for RNA-guided transposition of their DNA. Unlike traditional CRISPR systems that contain interference mechanisms to degrade targeted DNA, CASTs lack proteins and/or protein domains responsible for DNA cleavage. Specialized transposon machinery, similar to that of the well characterized Tn7 transposon, complexes with the CRISPR RNA (crRNA) and associated Cas proteins for transposition. CAST systems have been characterized in a wide range of bacteria and make use of variable CRISPR configurations including Type I-F, Type I-B, Type I-C, Type I-D, Type I-E, Type IV, and Type V-K. MGEs remain an important part of genetic exchange by horizontal gene transfer and CASTs have been implicated in the exchange of antibiotic resistance and antiviral defense mechanisms, as well as genes involved in central carbon metabolism. These systems show promise for genetic engineering due to their programmability, PAM flexibility, and ability to insert directly into the host genome without double strand breaks requiring activation of host repair mechanisms. They also lack Cas1 and Cas2 proteins and so rely on other more complete CRISPR systems for spacer acquisition in trans.

== Natural structure and function ==
CRISPR-associated transposons are similar to the Tn7 transposon which functions with a cut and paste mechanism. It contains a heteromeric transposase consisting of TnsA and TnsB proteins, and a regulator protein TnsC. Structural analysis has shown binding of the TnsB protein and sequence specific motifs on the ends of the transposon which allows for excision and mobility. Targeting for integration is done by the TnsD or TnsE proteins which preferentially target safe sites within the host chromosome or mobile elements (plasmids or bacteriophages), respectively. TnsE is not found in CASTs but a TnsD homolog, TniQ, is present and functions to bridge the gap between the transposase and CRISPR-Cas. Multiple CRISPR types have been found to associate with transposons with two of the most studied being Type I-F, which makes use of a multi-subunit effector (Cascade), and Type V-K, which makes use of a single Cas12k effector. In both cases, Tn7 transposons have evolved to make use of these effectors to create R loops for site-specific integration. While TnsA is present in Type I-F systems, it is notably absent in Type V-K systems which showed higher off-target integrations during initial characterization.

=== Type IF-3 ===
A Type IF-3 CAST (Tn6677) was initially identified in Vibrio Cholerae and has been extensively studied. This system contains proteins TnsA, TnsB, and TnsC that complex with Cas6, Cas7, and a Cas5-Cas8 fusion through interactions with TniQ. Initial integration steps include TniQ-Cascade binding at the target site and TnsA and TnsB excision of the transposon, which is followed by TnsC binding to TniQ and transposase binding to TnsC. There can be off-targeting prior to this final step, but TnsB and TnsC binding leads to a final proofreading step to maintain a high on-target percentage. Tn6677 integration has been validated at near 100% on-target efficiency at site specific locations in multiple points in the host genome. Other systems have also been characterized and validated in this class with varying ranges of efficiency, and include orthogonal systems for multiplexed insertions up to 10kb.

A unique characteristic of Type IF-3 systems is the presence of self-targeting guide RNA that are used to target the host chromosome. These systems have privatized the corresponding spacers through the use of atypical crRNA that prevent endogenous Type 1F systems from using the guides and their interference mechanisms to degrade the host. Another privatization mechanism is the use of mismatch tolerance allowing only CAST systems to target locations in the genome without an exact match to the spacer.

=== Type V-K ===
A Type V-K system was originally characterized from a cyanobacteria, Scytonema hofmanni, and contains a single Cas effector, Cas12k, that functions with a tracrRNA. This system functions similarly to Tn7 but does not have a TnsA protein which can result in off-targeting and chimera formation during over-expression. The Cas12k and tracrRNA complex bind to the target site and TnsC is polymerized directly adjacent prior to TniQ attachment and TnsB recognition and integration. While these systems use traditional tracrRNA characteristic of Type II CRISPR systems, they can also target with short crRNA located adjacent to the transposon end. Type V-K spacers preferentially target locations near tRNA genes, but other sites have been observed in these short crRNA guides which have been acquired by non-traditional means.

== Applications in genetic engineering ==
CRISPR-associated transposons have been harnessed for in vitro and in vivo gene editing at different targets, in different hosts, and with different payloads. All CAST components of the Tn6677 system from Vibrio cholerae have been combined into a single plasmid and confirmed to deliver up to 10kb transposons at near 100% efficiency. This has also been shown in a community context with conjugative delivery of suicide vectors to provide antibiotic resistance or enhanced metabolic function to only a single microbe. Much of the initial characterization of these systems has been done in E. coli, but functionality has been confirmed in betaproteobacteria and gammaproteobacteria with high efficiency, and in alphaproteobacteria at somewhat lower efficiency. A single plasmid Tn6677 has also been shown to function in human HEK293T cells showing potential therapeutic use in the future.
