= DNA-guided CRISPR =

Genetics sequence

DNA-guided CRISPR refers to engineered CRISPR-Cas systems that utilize synthetic DNA guides, rather than canonical RNA guides, to recognize and target RNA molecules. These systems primarily utilize Cas12a and variants such as Cas12i1 to separate protein activation from target recognition.

== Mechanism of action ==
In native bacterial defense systems, Cas12 activation requires a CRISPR RNA scaffold that forms a pseudoknot structure. Engineered systems replace this with a synthetic single-stranded DNA molecule, referred to as ΨDNA or crDNA.

Activation requires a Protospacer Adjacent Motif (PAM). The synthetic DNA guide mimics a crRNA framework and includes a 3' or 5' extension that binds the PAM-detecting region of Cas12. This interaction forms a stable deoxyribonucleoprotein (DNP) complex capable of binding complementary RNA strands. Structural analyses have detailed the molecular basis of this ternary complex. Target binding is enabled through molecular alignment.

Upon binding to target RNA, the Cas12-DNA complex undergoes a structural shift that activates the collateral cleavage of nearby single-stranded DNA. Depending on the Cas12 variant, the complex can degrade mRNA directly or physically block ribosomes to induce translational repression via no-go decay. DNA-guided Cas12 systems preferentially bind RNA and rarely interact with single- or double-stranded DNA targets.

== Development ==
The foundation and system for DNA-guided Cas12 RNA targeting was first established publicly in a November 2024 pre-print by the Jain laboratory. In 2026, the Jain laboratory and the Hsing laboratory (Wu et al.) published peer-reviewed validations of these guide architectures in Nature Biotechnology. These parallel developments were highlighted in an independent review. Subsequent optimizations of the guide backbones and spatial positioning enhanced binding affinity across orthologs such as AsCas12a and Cas12i1.

== See also ==
- CRISPR
- CRISPR-Cas12a
- Gene editing
- Synthetic biology
