= MAGESTIC =

Gene-editing technology

Multiplexed Accurate Genome Editing with Short, Trackable, Integrated Cellular barcodes (MAGESTIC) is a platform that builds on the CRISPR/Cas technique. It further improves CRISPR/Cas by making the gene-editing process more precise. It also increases cell survival during the editing process up to sevenfold.

This technology was invented at the Stanford Genome Technology Center in collaboration with the Joint Initiative for Metrology in Biology (JIMB) which is a coalition of Stanford University and the National Institute of Standards and Technology.

== Overview ==
Gene editing is used for a variety of tasks including the modifying of crops, the modifying of bacteria, and the modifying of disease-causing genetic mutations in patients. When only a single edited cell line is required, CRISPR/Cas combined with the endogenous DNA repair efficiency is sufficient to obtain an edited cell line. However, when trying to introduce many edits in multiplex, a higher efficiency of Homology directed repair is required. The MAGESTIC technology has multiple components. One component, the LexA-Fkh1 protein is involved in the process of Donor Recruitment that increases the efficiency of homology directed repair. The second component is a library of CRISPR Guide RNAs paired with donor DNA which encodes for specified edited to be integrated through homology directed repair. This in turn is linked to a DNA barcodes that allows for specific variants to be tracked in pools, similar to how Genome-wide CRISPR-Cas9 knockout screens work, only MAGESTIC is more versatile as it allows for not only loss of function edits, but also DNA Codon changes, Single-nucleotide polymorphism, Indels, and other types of genetic changes to be introduced and tracked. By improving DNA repair efficiency, using array-synthesized guide–donor oligos for the plasmid-based high-throughput editing, and integrating a genomic barcode to prevent plasmid barcode loss, MAGESTIC leads to more uniform pools with genome integrated stable single copy barcodes and enables robust phenotyping.

== Donor Recruitment ==
Because editing multiple sites in pools can be impacted by a number of factors including ineffective CRISPR Guide RNA, DNA synthesis errors, competition with Non-homologous end joining and other challenges that occur when building multiplex libraries, MAGESTIC screens required improved DNA repair. This is where the donor recruitment aspect of MAGESTIC comes in. MAGESTIC achieves greater editing efficiency by localizing donor DNA to the site of DNA breaks introduced by a CRISPR cut.

A CRISPR machinery cuts at desired locations in the genome, and then MAGESTIC direct the donor DNA to the site of this cut to direct cells to introduce designed edits at the DNA cut sites. This technology is called donor recruitment and relies on a fusion protein that contains one domain recruited to DNA breaks and another domain that binds to the donor DNA. This allows for the production of high quality precision edit pools in yeast, where each cells contains a single edit and a DNA barcode. The donor recruitment aspect of the technology also holds the potential to improve editing efficiency in additional cell types, such as mammalian cells. This may one day prove beneficial to gene therapies or other therapeutic editing.
