= CRISPR RNA =

RNA transcript from the CRISPR locus

CRISPR RNA or crRNA is a RNA transcript from the CRISPR locus. CRISPR-Cas (clustered, regularly interspaced short palindromic repeats - CRISPR associated systems) is an adaptive immune system found in bacteria and archaea to protect against mobile genetic elements, like viruses, plasmids, and transposons. The CRISPR locus contains a series of repeats interspaced with unique spacers. These unique spacers can be acquired from MGEs.

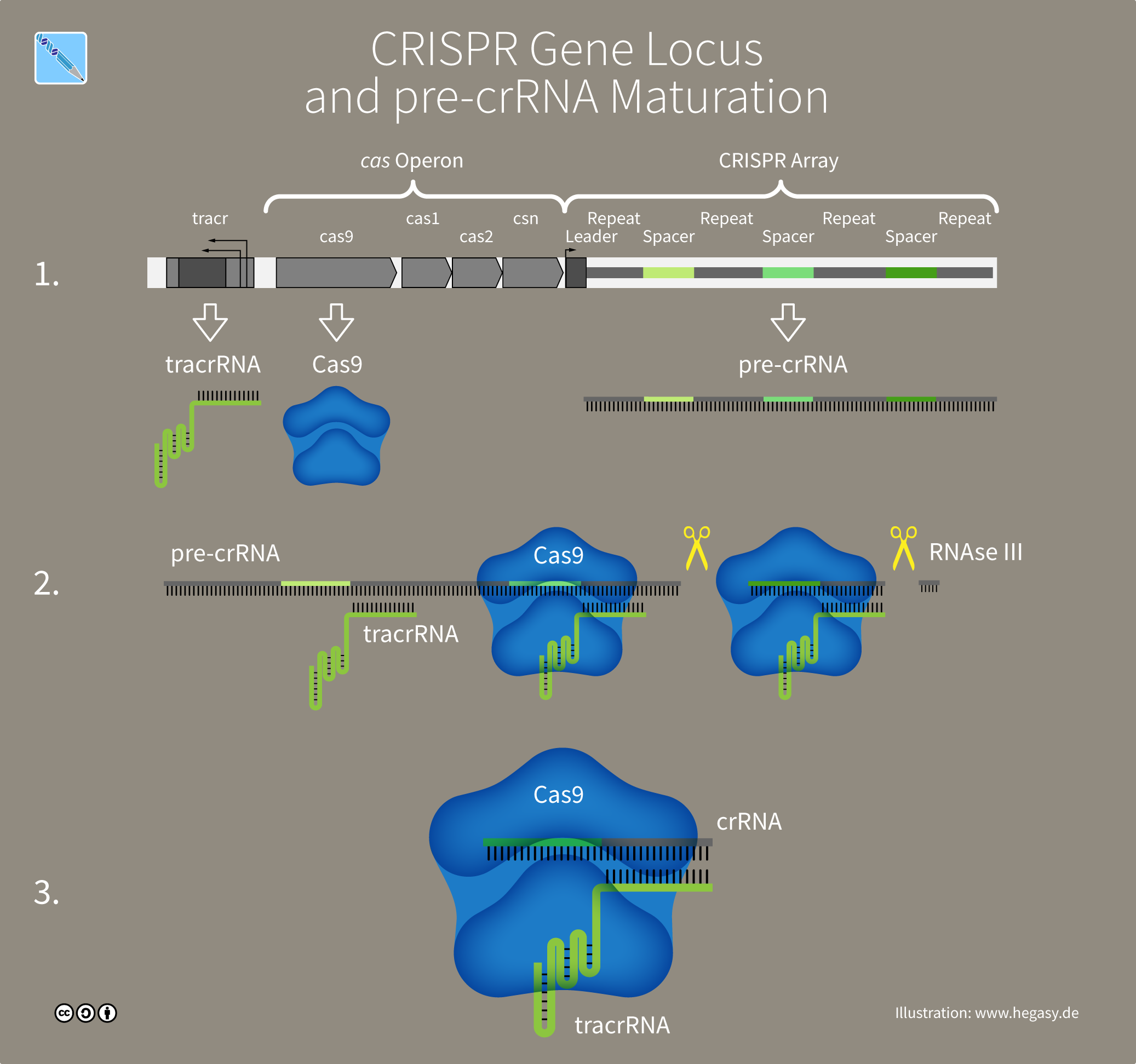
Transcripts of the CRISPR genetic locus and maturation of pre-crRNA

Pre-crRNA is formed after the transcription of the CRISPR locus and before being processed by Cas proteins. Mature crRNA transcripts contain a partial conserved section of repeat and a sequence of spacer that is complementary to the target DNA. crRNA forms an effector complex with a single nuclease or multiple Cas proteins called a Cascade (CRISPR-associated complex for antiviral defense). Once the effector complex is formed a Cas nuclease or single effector protein will cause interference guided by the crRNA match.

== Function ==
=== Type-I ===
Type-I CRISPR systems are characterized by Cas3, a nuclease-helicase protein, and the multi-subunit Cascade (CRISPR-associated complex for antiviral defense). The crRNA can form a complex with the Cas proteins in the Cascade and guide the complex to the target DNA sequence. Cas3 is recruited for the nuclease-helicase activity.

Typically in the Cascade, Cas6 generates the mature crRNAs while Cas5 and Cas7 process and stabilize the crRNA.

=== Type-II ===
Type-II CRISPR systems are characterized by the single signature nuclease Cas9. In type-II CRISPR systems crRNA and tracrRNA (trans-activating CRISPR RNA) can form a complex known as the guide RNA or gRNA. The crRNA within the gRNA is what matches up with the target sequence or protospacer after the PAM is found. Once the match is made Cas9 will make a double-stranded break.

Stages of CRISPR immunity for type-I, type-II, and type-III

=== Type-III ===
Type-III CRISPR systems are characterized by Cas10, an RNA cleaving protein. Similar to type-I, a large subunit effector complex is formed and crRNA guides the complex to the target sequence. Cas6 helps to generate the mature crRNA.

=== Type-IV ===
Type-IV CRISPR systems do not have an effector nuclease and are associated with plasmids and prophages. A Cas6-like enzyme is associated with the maturation of the crRNA. Not all type-IV systems have a CRISPR locus and therefore do not have crRNA.

=== Type-V ===
Type-V CRISPR systems are characterized by Cas12, a nuclease that can cleave ssDNA, dsDNA, and RNA. Like Cas9, Cas12 is the single effector nuclease. Type-V systems process pre-crRNA without tracrRNA. The mature crRNA in complex with Cas12 target the DNA sequence of interest and cleave the DNA.

=== Type-VI ===
Type-VI CRISPR systems are characterized by Cas13, a single effector protein that targets RNA. Like the type-V system, Cas13 can process the pre-crRNA without tracrRNA. The mature crRNA in complex with Cas13 guides the complex to the target RNA and degrades it.
