= Cas3 =

Protein used in CRISPR

CRISPR-associated helicase, Cas3 family
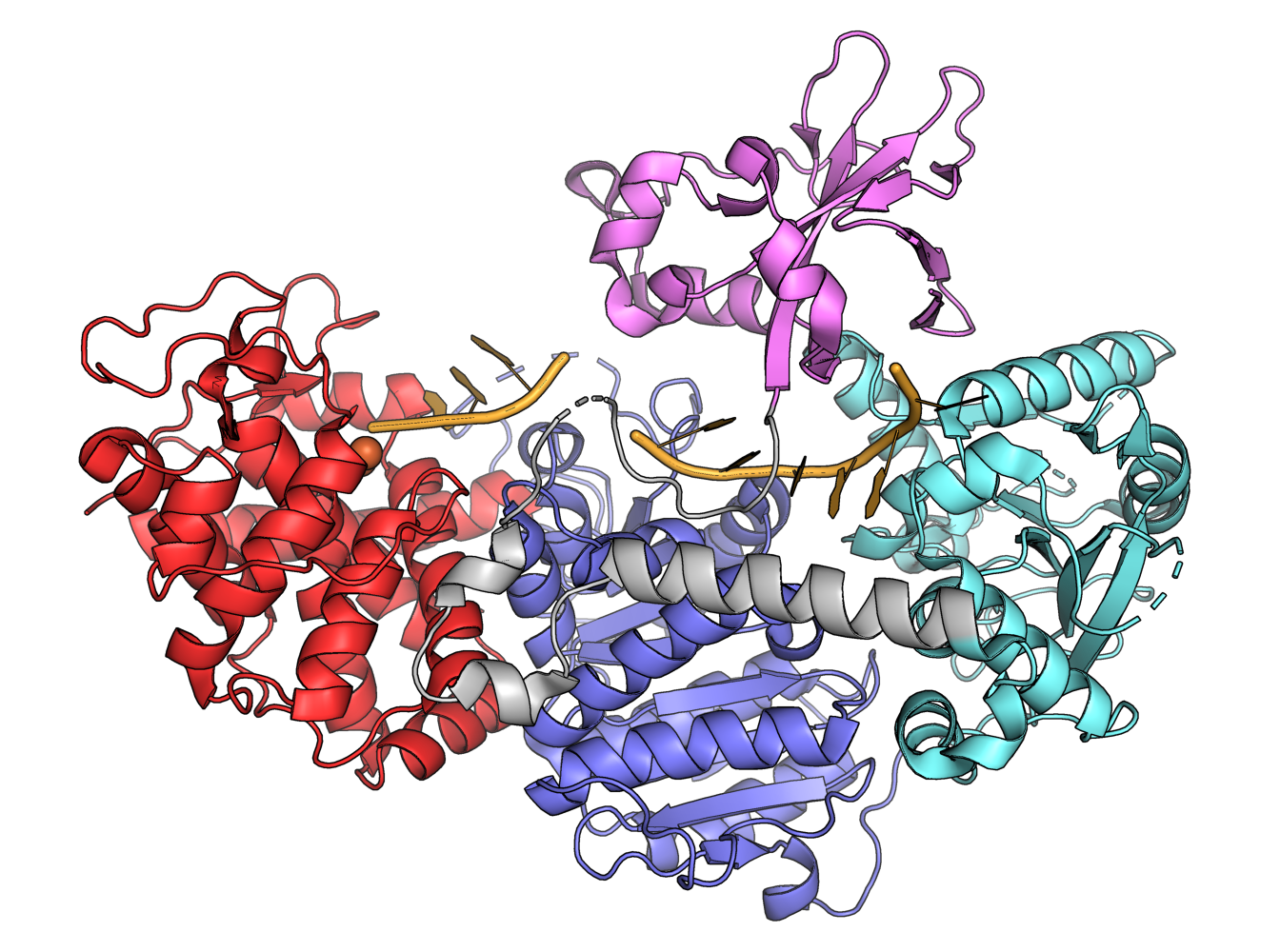
- Thermobifida fusca Cas3 PDB: 4QQW

Identifiers
- Organism: Thermobifida fusca
- Symbol: Cas3
- Orthologs: OMA: entry
- PDB: 4QQW
- UniProt: Q47PJ0
Search for
- Structures: Swiss-model
- Domains: InterPro

Cas3 C-terminal domain

Identifiers
- Symbol: cas3
- Pfam: PF18395
- InterPro: IPR041372
Available protein structures:
- PDB: IPR041372 PF18395 (ECOD; PDBsum)
- AlphaFold: IPR041372; PF18395

Cas3 is an ATP-dependent single-strand DNA (ssDNA) translocase/helicase enzyme that degrades DNA as part of CRISPR based immunity.

Cas3 is a "signature" protein of class 1 CRISPR systems and functions in a complex known as CASCADE, with other cas genes and a targeting RNA to degrade viral DNA.

In April 2019 Cornell University researcher Ailong Ke published a paper in the journal Molecular Cell describing a new gene editing CRISPR system, CRISPR-Cas3 which can efficiently delete long swaths of DNA from a targeted site in the human genome. This ability is superior to that achieved with the more common CRISPR-Cas9 systems.

CONAN, a CRISPR based diagnostic approach was developed utilising Cas3

== Structure and function ==
Thermophile Thermobifida fusca Cas3 is a four domain protein with an N-terminal HD-type nuclease domain, followed by two RecA-like domains forming a superfamily 2 helicase motif, then the Cas3 specific linker and C-terminal domain. Single stranded DNA is passed 3′-to-5′ from the helicase domain to the nuclease domain where it is hydrolysed.

=== Nuclease activity ===
Cas3 consists of an HD-nuclease domain fused to two RecA-like domains. These domains deliver ATP-dependent ssDNA translocation and degradation. An exposed helix and tyrosine/tryptophane residues located at the RecA-HD domain are essential for the functionality of this mechanism. Additionally, the nuclease function is supported by metal ions such as iron, manganese, and calcium, which work to regulate interactions between Cas3 and Cascade.

The validation of target DNA sequences by Cascade is essential for the effectiveness of Cas3 as a nuclease in CRISPR systems. This process is achieved through the identification of a Protospacer Adjacent Motif at a target sight, followed by the formation of a Cascade R-loop that locks onto the target DNA. This structure allows Cas3 to load onto the ssDNA and allow for interactions with the Cse1 subunit of Cascade channels. Specifically, Cas3 docks to the alpha helix H1 of Cse1, triggering the degradation of targeted DNA by the Cas3 HD-nuclease activity. This degradation is achieved through DNA nicking by the HD-nuclease in the R-loop, which displaces ssDNA. RecA domains power the ATP-dependent translocation of Cas3 along ssDNA.

=== Translocase and helicase activity ===
Following Cas3 loading onto ssDNA and ATP-dependent translocation, helicase activity takes place. Cas3 helicase can separate DNA duplex strands and may be able to displace other DNA proteins during translocation. This process takes place when Cas3 translocates away from Cascade while Cascade remains bound to the target site.

The C-terminal of Cas3 carries signature motifs of the superfamily 2 helicases of the DExD/H subgroup. Similar domains have been shown to recruit partner proteins and complexes, and the terminal domain of Cas3 may have the same function. Nine conserved domains Q, I, Ia, Ib and II–VI have been identified in superfamily 2 DExD/H-type helicases. These domains enable ATP-dependent helicases to translocate or remodel nucleic acids. Cas3 exhibits ssDNA-dependent ATPase activity, requiring Mg2+ ions for functionality. Additionally, the unwinding activity of Cas3 also depends on protein concentration and the presence of ATP.

== Functional implications ==
=== Gene editing ===
Cas3-catalyzed DNA destruction plays an important role in genetic editing reactions. Cas3, when complexed with Cascade, can function in targeted genetic insertions and deletions when delivered into cells as proteins with nuclear localization signals. Due to the requirement for Cascade to lock on to the DNA target before Cas3 activation, there is a low rate of off-target effects. Cas3 has been shown to facilitate large regions of genetic deletion, up to 200kb, when expressed in human HEK293 cells. Additionally, the exon-skipping capabilities of Cas3 show promise for future genetic therapy treatments for conditions such as muscular dystrophy.

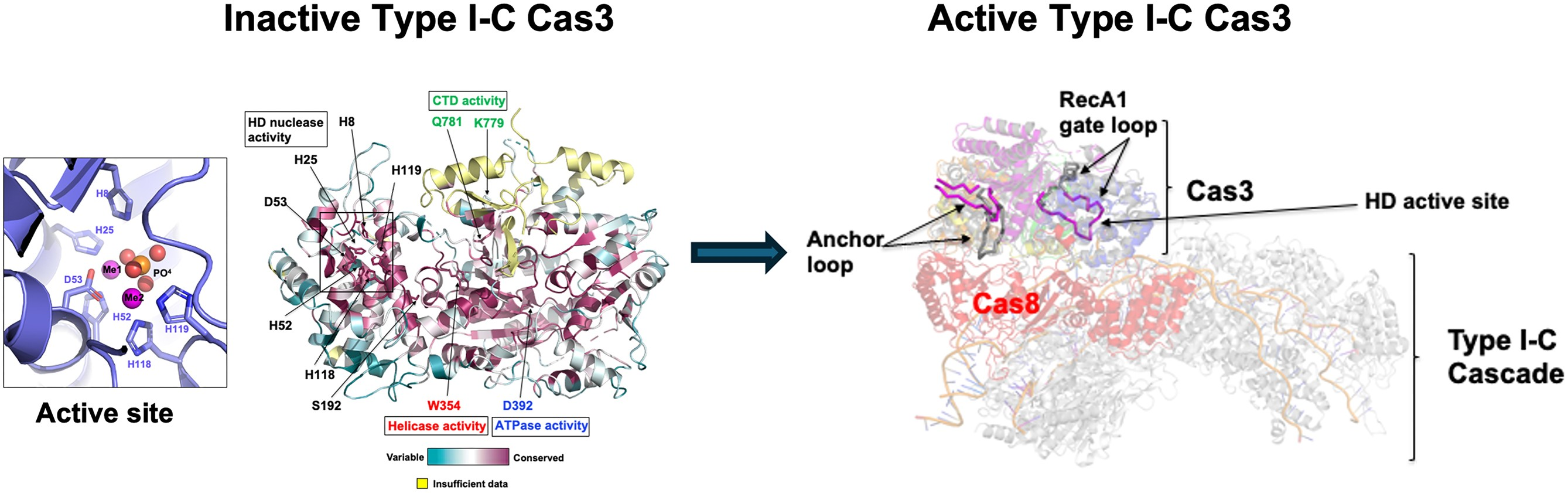
Depiction of inactive vs active Type I-C Cas3 and Cas3 active site

In comparison to the large-scale gene editing capabilities of Cas3, the current leading CRISPR-Cas9 and Cas12a enzymes are limited in their interventions. These enzymes yield small deletions and point mutations. On the other hand, a Cascade-Cas3 system can be used for much larger deletions with high efficiency. This is achieved through the unique capabilities of Cas3 allowing for bi-directional deletions from one cut site. Additionally, bi-directional capabilities allow for rapid deletions compared to other enzymes.

=== CRISPR-mediated adaptive immunity ===
CRISPR-mediated adaptive immunity requires three stages: sequence acquisition, CRISPR RNA biogenesis, and target interference. CRISPR RNA-guided surveillance complexes aid this process in efficiently targeting non-self through the recognition of short motifs. Type IE systems, which use Cas3, use a Cascade as the surveillance complex in this process. Through the binding and bending of Cascade to target DNA, R-loops are formed, and Cas3 is recruited to the complex.

ATP enhances Cas3 recruitment to R-loops, and binding enhances Cas3 ATPase activity. The HD-nuclease domain of Cas3 nicks and unidirectionally degrades the target DNA of the displaced strand in the 3' to 5' direction. Cas3-mediated degradation may also recruit Cas1 and Cas2, proteins involved in the process of integrating spacers, priming for future foreign immunity.
