= CRISPR =

Family of DNA sequences found in prokaryotic organisms

Cascade (CRISPR-associated complex for antiviral defense)
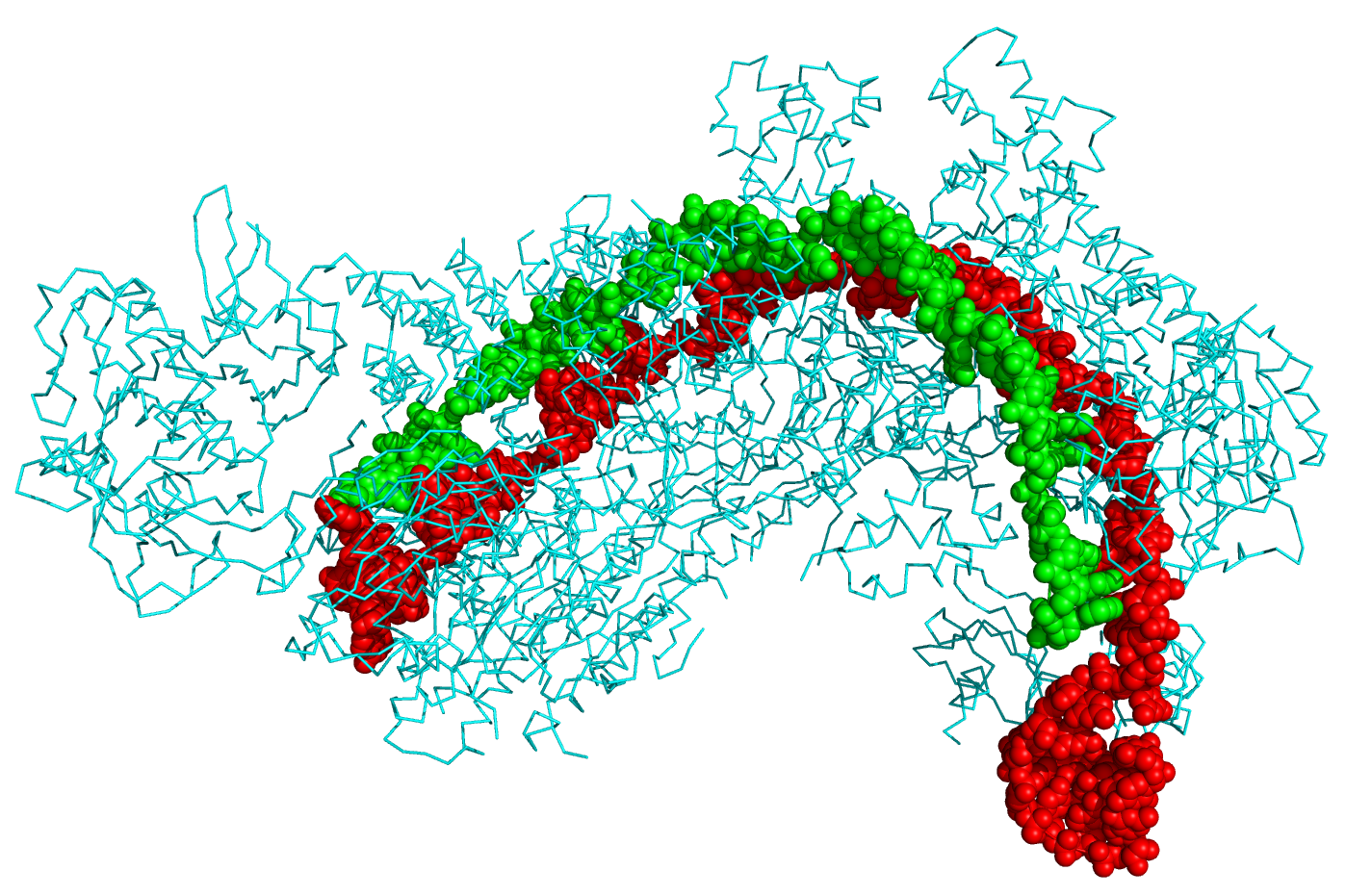
- CRISPR Cascade protein (cyan) bound to CRISPR RNA (green) and phage DNA (red)

Identifiers
- Organism: Escherichia coli
- Symbol: CRISPR
- Entrez: 947229
- Orthologs: NCBI: entry; OMA: entry
- PDB: 4QYZ
- RefSeq (Prot): NP_417241.1
- UniProt: P38036
Search for
- Structures: Swiss-model
- Domains: InterPro

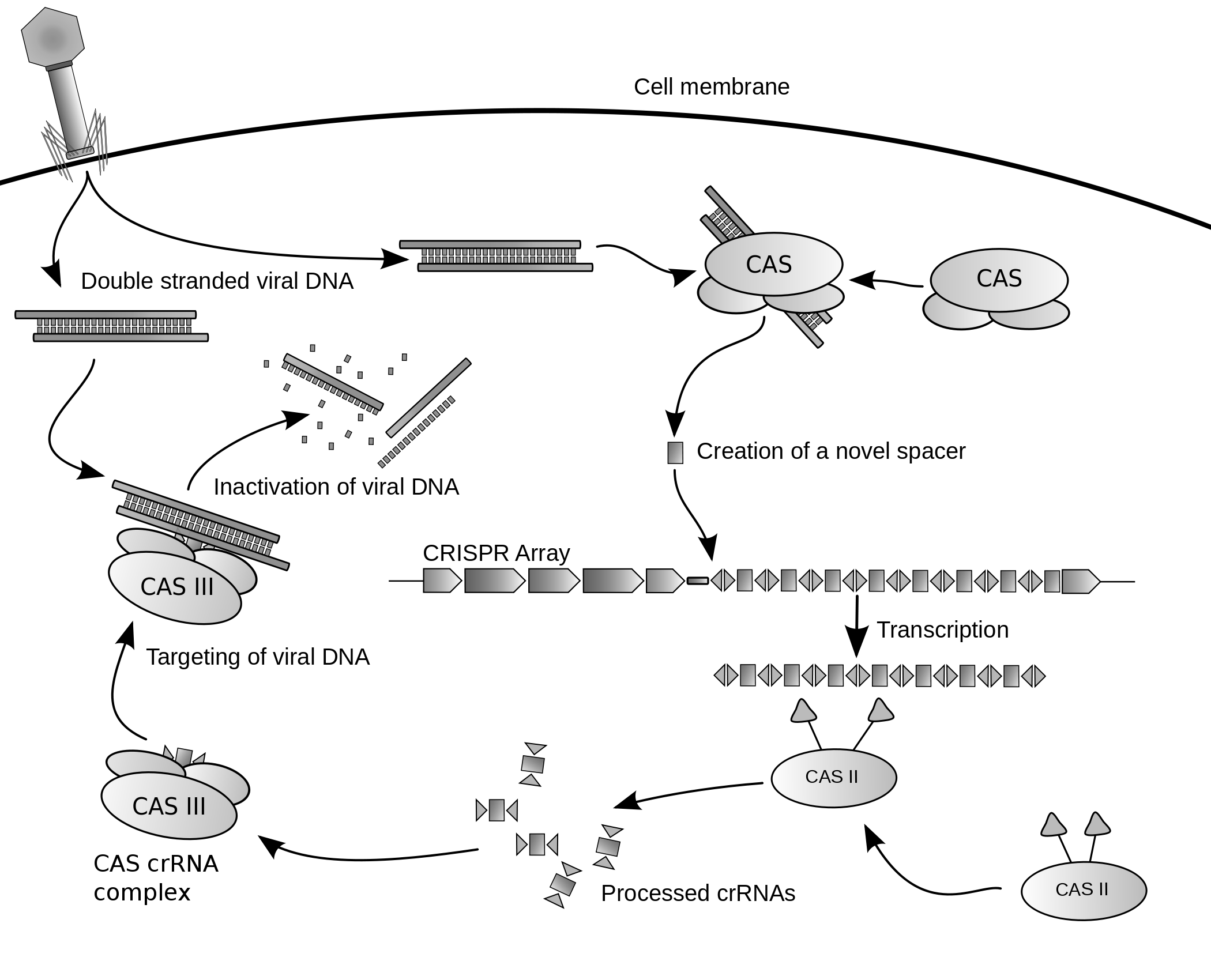
Diagram of the CRISPR prokaryotic antiviral defense mechanism

CRISPR (/ˈkrɪspər/; acronym for clustered regularly interspaced short palindromic repeats) is a family of DNA sequences found in the genomes of prokaryotic organisms such as bacteria and archaea. Each sequence within an individual prokaryotic CRISPR is derived from a DNA fragment of a bacteriophage that had previously infected the prokaryote or one of its ancestors. These sequences are used to detect and destroy DNA from similar bacteriophages during subsequent infections. Hence these sequences play a key role in the antiviral (i.e. anti-phage) defense system of prokaryotes and provide a form of heritable, acquired immunity. CRISPR is found in approximately 50% of sequenced bacterial genomes and nearly 90% of sequenced archaea.

Cas9 (or "CRISPR-associated protein 9") is an enzyme that uses CRISPR sequences as a guide to recognize and open up specific strands of DNA that are complementary to the CRISPR sequence. Cas9 enzymes together with CRISPR sequences form the basis of a technology known as CRISPR-Cas9 that can be used to edit genes within living organisms. This editing process has a wide variety of applications including basic biological research, development of biotechnological products, and treatment of diseases. The development of the CRISPR-Cas9 genome editing technique was recognized by the Nobel Prize in Chemistry in 2020 awarded to Emmanuelle Charpentier and Jennifer Doudna.

== History ==
The CRISPR/Cas system evolved in nature as a means for bacteria to protect themselves from invading viruses and bacteriophages by inserting pieces of their DNA into the host genome. This allowed the adaptive immune system to respond accordingly on a subsequent infection. It was discovered in Streptococcus pyogenes and later found across many other species.

=== Repeated sequences ===
The discovery of clustered DNA repeats took place independently in three parts of the world. The first description of what would later be called CRISPR is Ishino, et al. in 1987. They accidentally cloned part of a CRISPR sequence together with the iap gene (isozyme conversion of alkaline phosphatase) from Escherichia coli. The organization of the repeats surprised them, as clustered repeated sequences are more typically arranged consecutively, without interspersing sequences.

In 1993, van Solingen et al., published two articles about a cluster of interrupted direct repeats (DR) in that bacterium. The team recognized the diversity of the sequences that intervened in the direct repeats among different strains of M. tuberculosis and used this property to design a typing method called spoligotyping, which remains in use.

Spanish microbiologist Francisco Mojica studied the function of repeats in the archaeal genera Haloferax and Haloarcula. Mojica's supervisor surmised that the clustered repeats had a role in segregating replicated DNA into daughter cells during cell division, because plasmids and chromosomes with identical repeat arrays could not coexist in Haloferax volcanii. They noted the transcription of the interrupted repeats for the first time; CRISPR's first full characterization. By 2000, Mojica and his students, after an automated search of published genomes, identified interrupted repeats in 20 species of microbes as belonging to the same family. Because those sequences were interspaced, Mojica initially called these sequences "short regularly spaced repeats" (SRSR). In 2001, Mojica and Jansen, who were searching for additional interrupted repeats, proposed the acronym CRISPR (Clustered Regularly Interspaced Short Palindromic Repeats) to encompass the numerous acronyms then in use. In 2002, Tang, et al. showed evidence that CRISPR repeat regions in Archaeoglobus fulgidus were transcribed into long RNA molecules subsequently processed into unit-length small RNAs, plus some longer forms of 2, 3, or more spacer-repeat units.

In 2005, Barrangou discovered that S thermophilus, after iterative phage infection challenges, develops increased phage resistance due to the incorporation of additional CRISPR spacer sequences.

== CRISPR-associated systems ==
A major advance came with Jansen's observation that the prokaryote repeat cluster was accompanied by four homologous genes, CRISPR-associated systems, Cas 1–4. The Cas proteins showed helicase and nuclease motifs, suggesting a role in the dynamic structure of the CRISPR loci. However, CRISPR's function remained enigmatic.

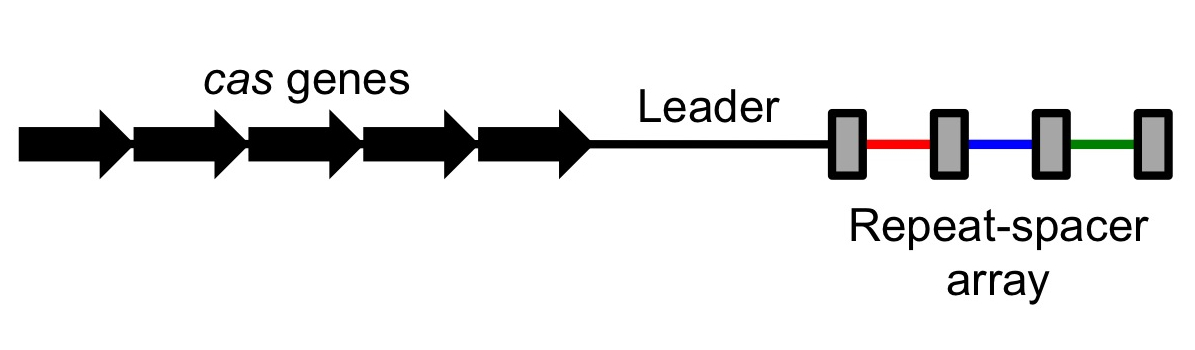
Simplified diagram of a CRISPR locus. The three major components of a CRISPR locus are shown: cas genes, a leader sequence, and a repeat-spacer array. Repeats are shown as gray boxes and spacers are colored bars. The arrangement of the three components is not always as shown. In addition, several CRISPRs with similar sequences can be present in a single genome, only one of which is associated with cas genes.

In 2005, three independent research groups showed that some CRISPR spacers are derived from phage DNA and extrachromosomal DNA such as plasmids. In effect, the spacers are fragments of DNA gathered from viruses that previously attacked the cell. The source of the spacers was a sign that the CRISPR-cas system could have a role in adaptive immunity in bacteria. All three studies proposing this idea were initially rejected by high-profile journals, but eventually appeared elsewhere.

The first publication proposing a role of CRISPR-Cas in microbial immunity, by Mojica, et al., predicted a role for the RNA transcript of spacers on target recognition in a mechanism that could be analogous to the RNA interference system used by eukaryotic cells. Koonin and colleagues extended this RNA interference hypothesis by proposing mechanisms of action for the different CRISPR-Cas subtypes according to the predicted function of their proteins.

Experimental work by several groups revealed the basic mechanisms of CRISPR-Cas immunity. In 2007, the first experimental evidence that CRISPR was part of the adaptive immune system was published. A CRISPR region in Streptococcus thermophilus acquired spacers from the DNA of an infecting bacteriophage. The researchers manipulated the resistance of S. thermophilus to different types of phages by adding and deleting spacers whose sequence matched those found in the phages. In 2008, Brouns and Van der Oost identified a complex of Cas proteins called Cascade, that in E. coli cut the CRISPR RNA precursor within the repeats into mature spacer-containing RNA molecules called CRISPR RNA (crRNA), which remained bound to the protein complex. Cascade, crRNA and a helicase/nuclease (Cas3) were required to provide a bacterial host with immunity against infection by a DNA virus. By designing an anti-virus CRISPR, they demonstrated that two orientations of the crRNA (sense/antisense) provided immunity, indicating that the crRNA guides were targeting dsDNA. That year Marraffini and Sontheimer confirmed that a CRISPR sequence of S. epidermidis targeted DNA and not RNA to prevent conjugation. This finding was at odds with the proposed RNA-interference-like mechanism of CRISPR-Cas immunity, although a CRISPR-Cas system that targets foreign RNA was later found in Pyrococcus furiosus. A 2010 study reported that CRISPR-Cas cuts strands of both phage and plasmid DNA in S. thermophilus.

In 2012, Jinek et al. fused crRNA and tracrRNA into a single-guide RNA, simplifying Cas9 targeting. Šikšnys, et al., reported that Cas9 from S. thermophilus can target specific DNA by altering crRNA. In 2013, Cong, et al., as well as Mali, et al., applied CRISPR-Cas9 to edit human cell cultures. In 2015, Liang, et al., edited human tripronuclear zygotes, achieving successful cleavage in 28 of 54 embryos.

=== Cas9 ===
The Cas9 endonuclease introduces site-specific double-stranded breaks in DNA, enabling gene inactivation, removal, or insertion through cellular repair mechanisms such as non-homologous end joining or homologous recombination.

Cas9 was discovered in Streptococcus pyogenes and later in S. thermophilus. It functions with two small RNAs—crRNA and tracrRNA—to form a four-component complex. In 2012, Doudna and Charpentier fused the RNAs into a single-guide RNA, enabling Cas9 to cut specific DNA sequences. These developments spurred genome modification efforts, including groups led by Zhang and Church who showed genome editing in human cells.

=== Cas12a ===
Cas12a (CRISPR-associated protein 12a, previously Cpf1) is a Class II Type V CRISPR-associated endonuclease-exonuclease. In bacteria such as F. novicida, its natural context, Cas12a targets and destroys the genetic material of viruses and other foreign mobile genetic elements. In a target organism, crRNA contains a constant region that Cas12a recognizes and a "spacer" region that is complementary to a piece of foreign nucleic acid (e.g., a portion of a phage genome) that previously infected the cell.

Cas12a is distinct from Cas9: it generates staggered cuts in double-stranded DNA, in contrast to the blunt ends; it relies on a 'T-rich' protospacer adjacent motif (PAM) (typically 5'-TTTV-3', where V is A, C, or G), offering alternative sites compared to the 'G-rich' PAMs (typically 5'-NGG-3') favored by Cas9; and it requires only a CRISPR RNA (crRNA) for effective targeting, whereas Cas9 necessitates both a crRNA and a trans-activating crRNA (tracrRNA).

=== DNA-guided CRISPR ===
Originally introduced by the Jain lab in pre-print, modified versions of Class II systems (specifically Cas12a) function with an artificial single-stranded DNA guide in place of natural RNA. Within this new paradigm, the system's endonuclease activity now is redirected towards cleaving ssRNA instead of dsDNA. With DNA as the guide, the need for intricate RNA preparation and preservation is no longer required, allowing Class II effectors more versatility in programmable RNA targeting and translational biotechnology.

=== Cas13 ===
Cas13 is a family of orthologous CRISPR-associated endonucleases that target RNA (unlike Cas9 and Cas12, which target DNA). Cas13 employs a single endonuclease to bind and cleave specific ssRNAs with sequence complementarity to a guide RNA. Cas13 performs two distinct ribonuclease functions: procession of its own CRISPR RNA and catalysis of target RNA cleavage. The system's specificity allows for the correction of mutations at the transcript level.

Cas13 remains bound to the target RNA and then cleaves other ssRNA molecules indiscriminately. This "collateral" trans-cleavage activity is exploited in the development of various diagnostic technologies. It has been used to efficiently repair KRAS-G12D mRNA in pancreatic cancer models while minimizing effects on healthy cells; adapted into tools such as the REPAIR platform, which edits RNA bases to treat genetic disorders, including Usher syndrome, in animal models; and utilized in diagnostic platforms like SHERLOCK to detect pathogens, tumor DNA, and viral variants with high sensitivity. Other biotechnological applications of Cas13 have included RNA imaging, phage genome engineering, and transient or isoform-specific gene regulation.

== Locus structure ==
=== Repeats and spacers ===
The CRISPR array is made up of an AT-rich leader sequence followed by short repeats that are separated by unique spacers. CRISPR repeats typically range in size from 28 to 37 base pairs (bps), though there can be as few as 23 bp and as many as 55 bp. Some show dyad symmetry, implying the formation of a secondary structure such as a stem-loop ('hairpin') in the RNA, while others are designed to be unstructured. The size of spacers in different CRISPR arrays is typically 32 to 38 bp (range 21 to 72 bp). New spacers can appear rapidly as part of the immune response to phage infection. There are usually fewer than 50 units of the repeat-spacer sequence in a CRISPR array.

=== CRISPR RNA structures ===
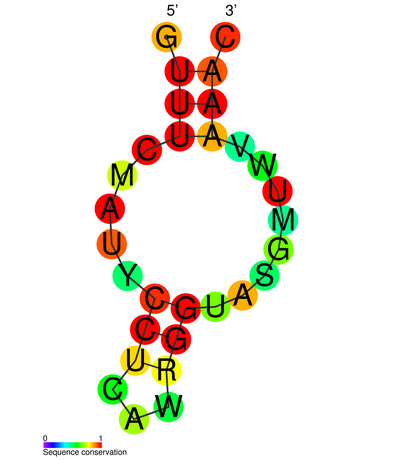
CRISPR-DR2: Secondary structure taken from the Rfam database. Family RF01315.

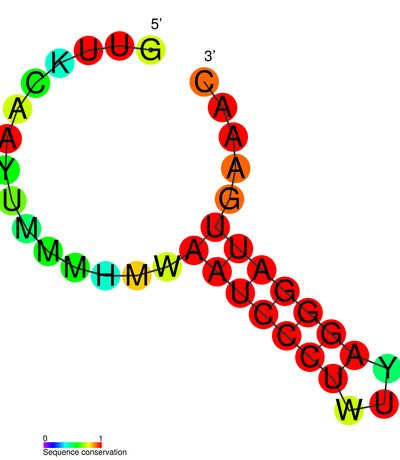
CRISPR-DR5: Secondary structure taken from the Rfam database. Family RF01318.

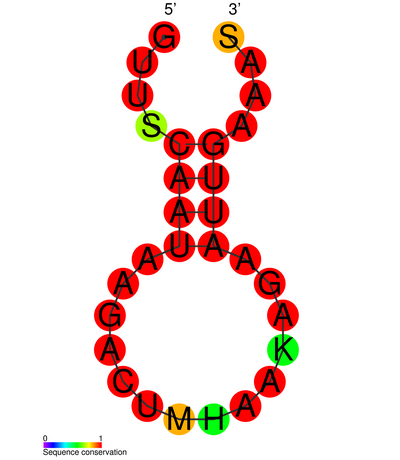
CRISPR-DR6: Secondary structure taken from the Rfam database. Family RF01319.

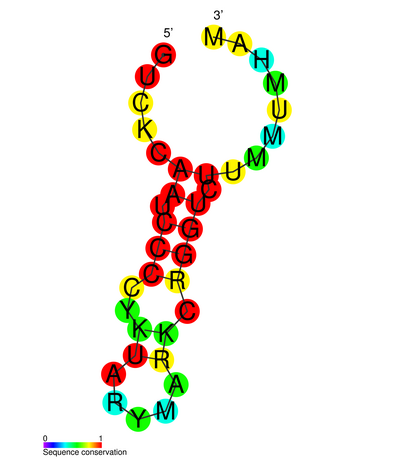
CRISPR-DR8: Secondary structure taken from the Rfam database. Family RF01321.

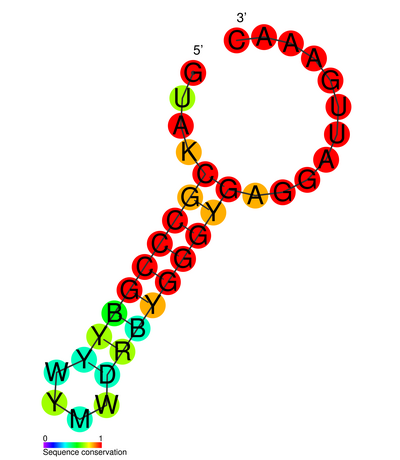
CRISPR-DR9: Secondary structure taken from the Rfam database. Family RF01322.

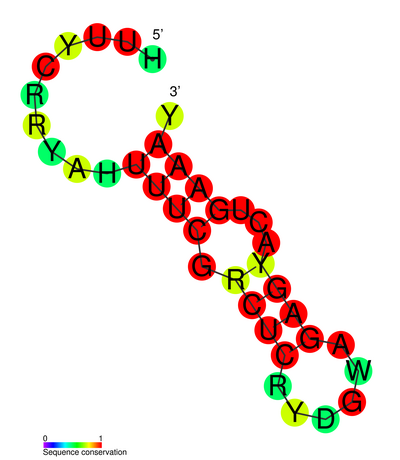
CRISPR-DR19: Secondary structure taken from the Rfam database. Family RF01332.

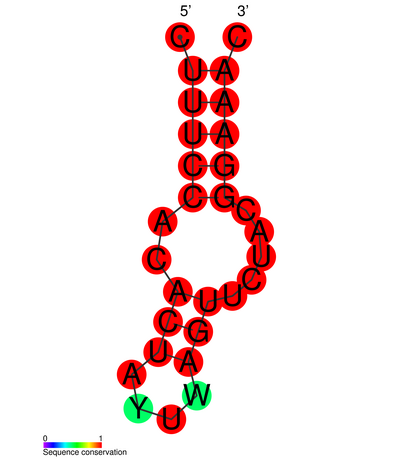
CRISPR-DR41: Secondary structure taken from the Rfam database. Family RF01350.

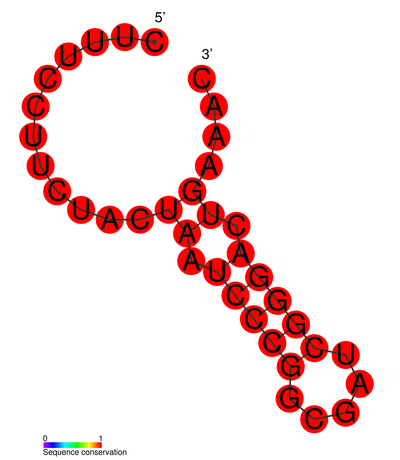
CRISPR-DR52: Secondary structure taken from the Rfam database. Family RF01365.

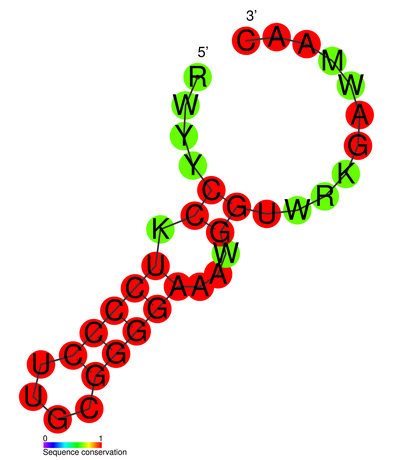
CRISPR-DR57: Secondary structure taken from the Rfam database. Family RF01370.

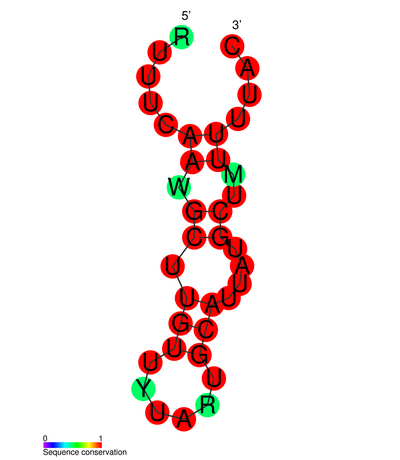
CRISPR-DR65: Secondary structure taken from the Rfam database. Family RF01378.

=== Cas genes and CRISPR subtypes ===
Small clusters of cas genes are often located next to CRISPR repeat-spacer arrays. Collectively the 93 cas genes are grouped into 35 families based on sequence similarity of the encoded proteins. 11 of the 35 families form the cas core, which includes the protein families Cas1 through Cas9. A complete CRISPR-Cas locus has at least one gene belonging to the cas core.

CRISPR-Cas systems fall into two classes. Class 1 systems use a complex of multiple Cas proteins to degrade foreign nucleic acids. Class 2 systems use a single large Cas protein for the same purpose. Class 1 is divided into types I, III, and IV; class 2 is divided into types II, V, and VI. The 6 system types are divided into 33 subtypes. Each type and most subtypes are characterized by a "signature gene" found almost exclusively in the category. Classification is also based on the complement of cas genes that are present. Most CRISPR-Cas systems have a Cas1 protein. The phylogeny of Cas1 proteins generally agrees with the classification system, but exceptions exist due to module shuffling. Many organisms contain multiple CRISPR-Cas systems suggesting that they are compatible and may share components. The sporadic distribution of the CRISPR-Cas subtypes suggests that the CRISPR-Cas system is subject to horizontal gene transfer during microbial evolution.

Signature genes and their putative functions for the major and minor CRISPR-cas types
Class	Cas type	Cas subtype	Signature protein	Function	Ref.
1	I	—	Cas3	Single-stranded DNA nuclease (HD domain) and ATP-dependent helicase	
1	I	I-A	Cas8a, Cas5	Cas8 is a Subunit of the interference module that is important in targeting of invading DNA by recognizing the PAM sequence. Cas5 is required for processing and stability of crRNAs.	
1	I	I-B	Cas8b	Cas8 is a Subunit of the interference module that is important in targeting of invading DNA by recognizing the PAM sequence. Cas5 is required for processing and stability of crRNAs.	
1	I	I-C	Cas8c	Cas8 is a Subunit of the interference module that is important in targeting of invading DNA by recognizing the PAM sequence. Cas5 is required for processing and stability of crRNAs.	
1	I	I-D	Cas10d	contains a domain homologous to the palm domain of nucleic acid polymerases and nucleotide cyclases	
1	I	I-E	Cse1, Cse2	contains a domain homologous to the palm domain of nucleic acid polymerases and nucleotide cyclases	
1	I	I-F	Csy1, Csy2, Csy3	Type IF-3 have been implicated in CRISPR-associated transposons	
1	I	I-G (Note: Subtype I-G was previously known as subtype I-U.)	GSU0054		
1	III	—	Cas10	Homolog of Cas10d and Cse1. Binds CRISPR target RNA and promotes stability of the interference complex	
1	III	III-A	Csm2	Not determined	
1	III	III-B	Cmr5	Not determined	
1	III	III-C	Cas10 or Csx11		
1	III	III-D	Csx10		
1	III	III-E			
1	III	III-F			
1	IV	—	Csf1		
1	IV	IV-A			
1	IV	IV-B			
1	IV	IV-C			
2	II	—	Cas9	Nucleases RuvC and HNH together produce DSBs, and separately can produce single-strand breaks. Ensures the acquisition of functional spacers during adaptation.	
2	II	II-A	Csn2	Ring-shaped DNA-binding protein. Involved in primed adaptation in Type II CRISPR system.	
2	II	II-B	Cas4	Endonuclease that works with cas1 and cas2 to generate spacer sequences	
2	II	II-C		Characterized by the absence of either Csn2 or Cas4	
2	V	—	Cas12	Nuclease RuvC. Lacks HNH.	
2	V	V-A	Cas12a (Cpf1)	Auto-processing pre-crRNA activity for multiplex gene regulation	
2	V	V-B	Cas12b (C2c1)		
2	V	V-C	Cas12c (C2c3)		
2	V	V-D	Cas12d (CasY)		
2	V	V-E	Cas12e (CasX)		
2	V	V-F	Cas12f (Cas14, C2c10)		
2	V	V-G	Cas12g		
2	V	V-H	Cas12h		
2	V	V-I	Cas12i		
2	V	V-K (Note: Subtype V-K was previously known as subtype V-U5.)	Cas12k (C2c5)	Type V-K have been implicated in CRISPR-associated transposons.	
2	V	V-U	C2c4, C2c8, C2c9		
2	VI	—	Cas13	RNA-guided RNase	
2	VI	VI-A	Cas13a (C2c2)		
2	VI	VI-B	Cas13b		
2	VI	VI-C	Cas13c		
2	VI	VI-D	Cas13d		
2	VI	VI-X	Cas13x.1	RNA dependent RNA polymerase, Prophylactic RNA-virus inhibition	
2	VI	VI-Y			

== Mechanism ==
The stages of CRISPR immunity for each of the 3 major types of adaptive immunity. (1) Acquisition begins by recognition of invading DNA by Cas1 and Cas2 and cleavage of a protospacer. (2) The protospacer is ligated to the direct repeat adjacent to the leader sequence and (3) single strand extension repairs the CRISPR and duplicates the direct repeat. The crRNA processing and interference stages occur differently in each of the three major CRISPR systems. (4) The primary CRISPR transcript is cleaved by cas genes to produce crRNAs. (5) In type I systems Cas6e/Cas6f cleave at the junction of ssRNA and dsRNA formed by hairpin loops in the direct repeat. Type II systems use a trans-activating (tracr) RNA to form dsRNA, which is cleaved by Cas9 and RNaseIII. Type III systems use a Cas6 homolog that does not require hairpin loops in the direct repeat for cleavage. (6) In type II and type III systems secondary trimming is performed at either the 5' or 3' end to produce mature crRNAs. (7) Mature crRNAs associate with Cas proteins to form interference complexes. (8) In type I and type II systems, interactions between the protein and PAM sequence are required for degradation of invading DNA. Type III systems do not require a PAM for successful degradation and in type III-A systems basepairing occurs between the crRNA and mRNA rather than the DNA, targeted by type III-B systems.

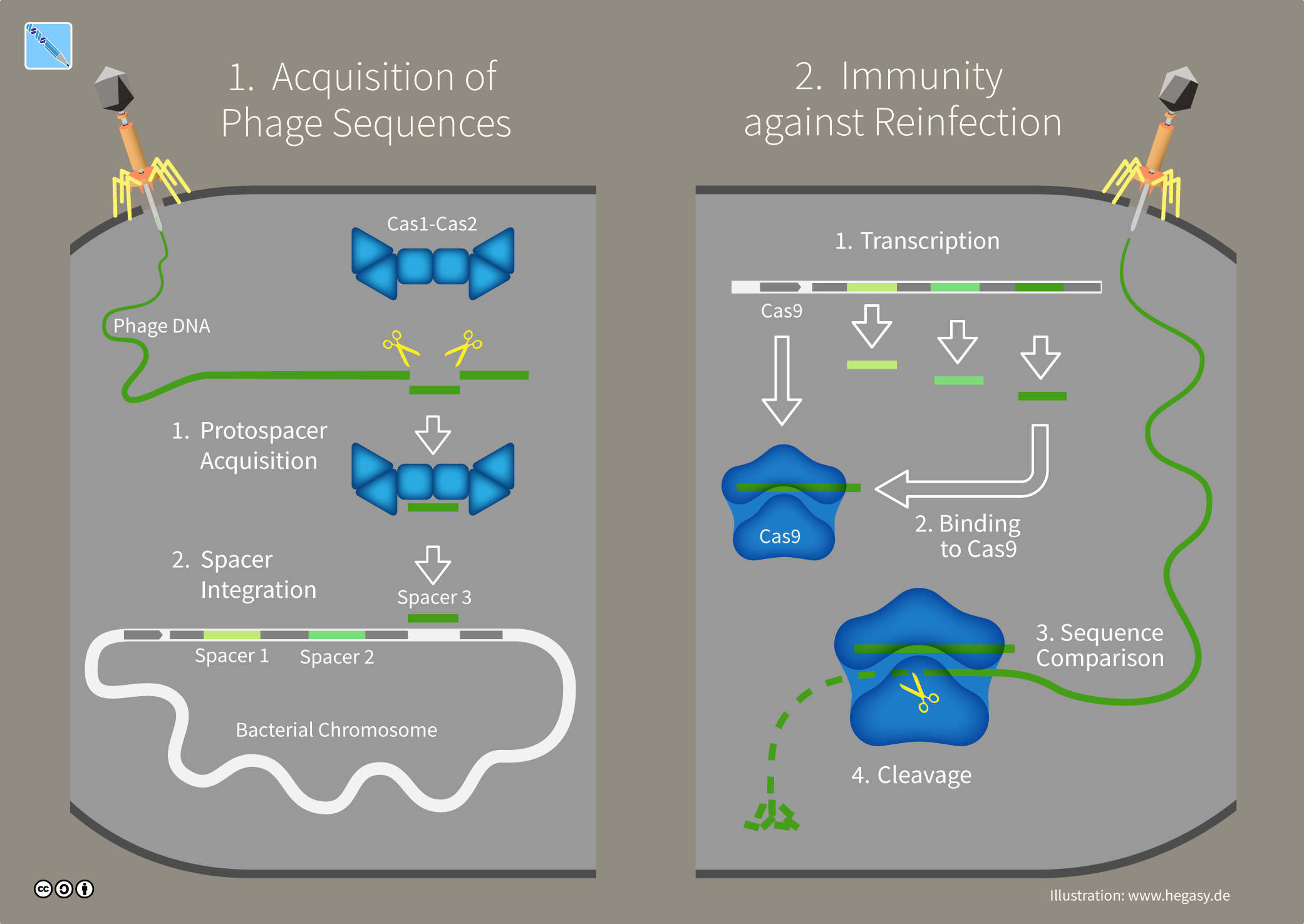
The CRISPR genetic locus provides bacteria with a defense mechanism to protect them from repeated phage infections.

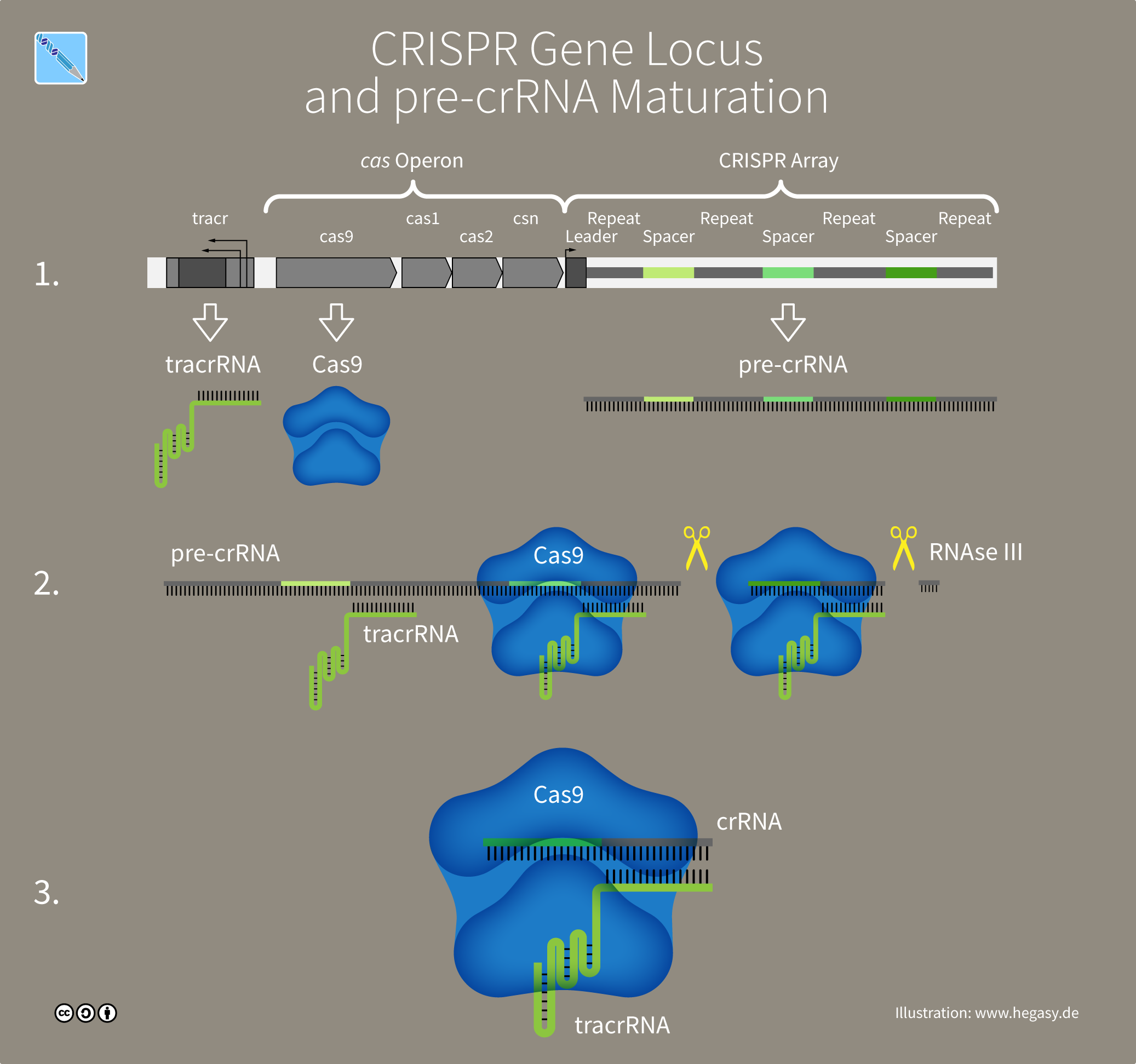
Transcripts of the CRISPR Genetic Locus and Maturation of pre-crRNA

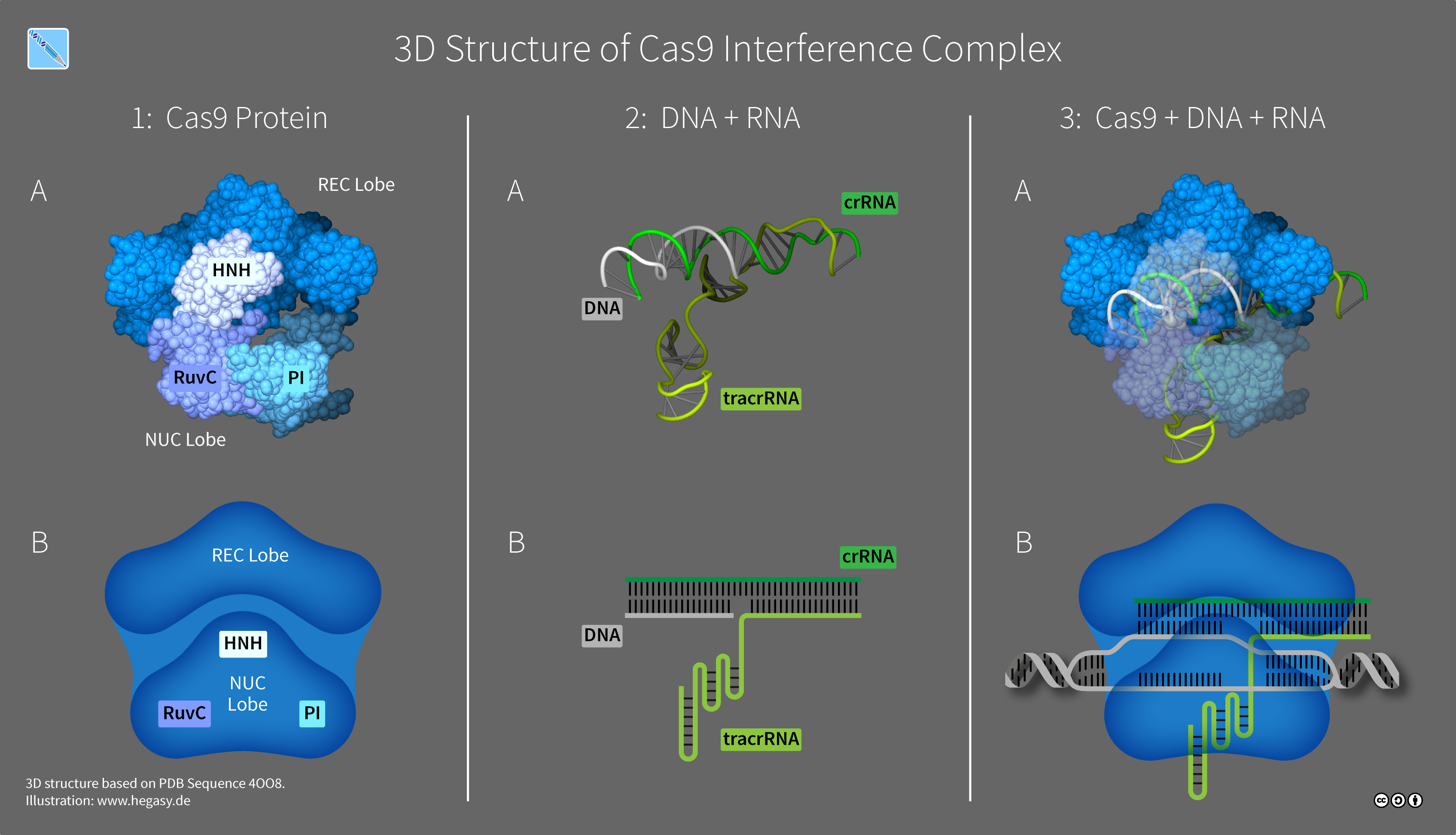
3D structure of the CRISPR-Cas9 interference complex

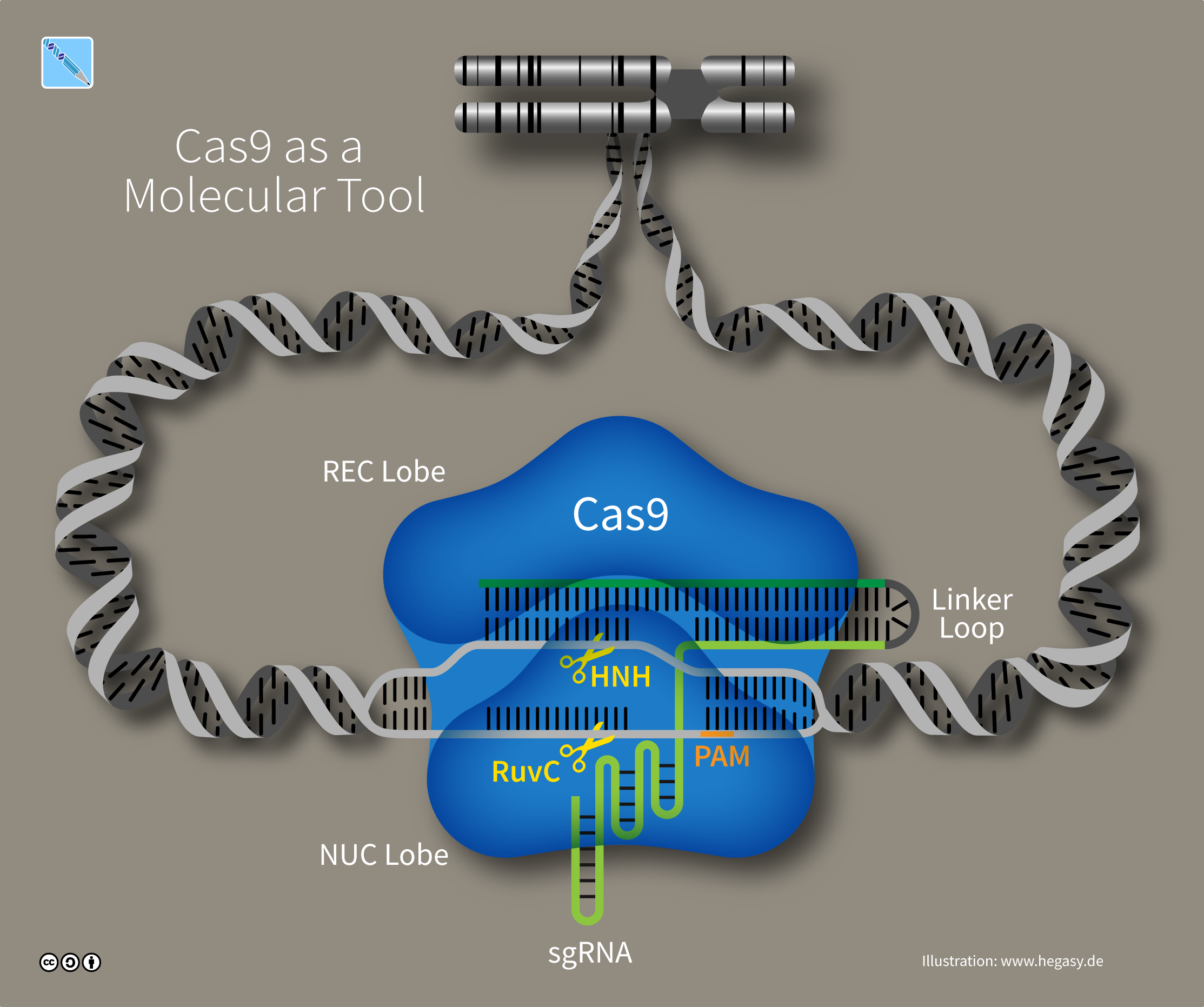
CRISPR-Cas9 as a molecular tool introduces targeted double strand DNA breaks.

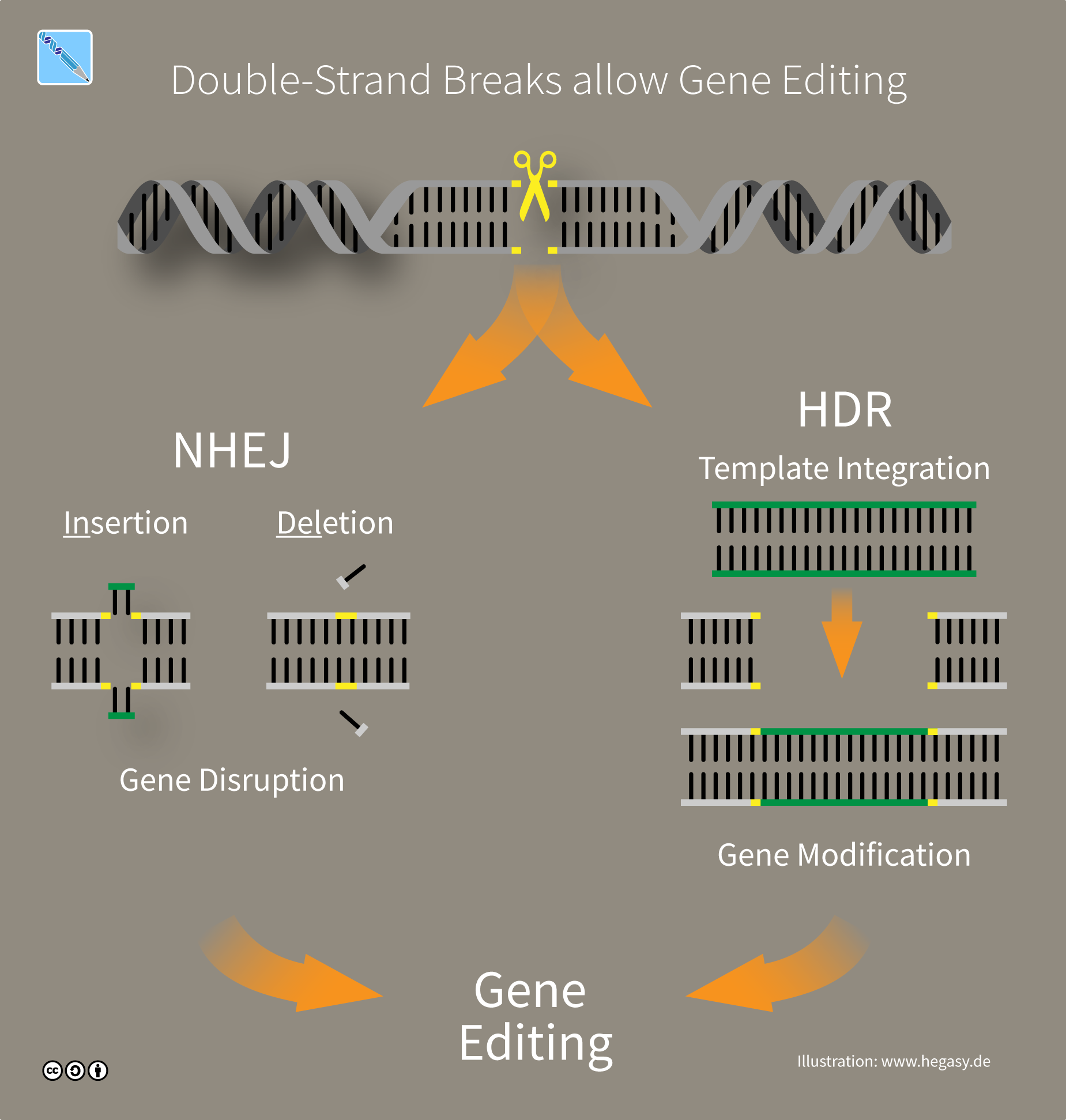
Double-strand DNA breaks introduced by CRISPR-Cas9 allows further genetic manipulation by exploiting endogenous DNA repair mechanisms.

CRISPR-Cas immunity is a natural process of bacteria and archaea. CRISPR-Cas prevents bacteriophage infection, conjugation and natural transformation by degrading foreign nucleic acids that enter the cell.

=== Spacer acquisition ===
When a microbe is invaded by a bacteriophage, the first stage of the immune response is to capture phage DNA and insert it into a CRISPR locus in the form of a spacer. Cas1 and Cas2 are found in both types of CRISPR-Cas immune systems, which indicates that they are involved in spacer acquisition. Mutation studies confirmed this hypothesis, showing that removal of Cas1 or Cas2 stopped spacer acquisition, without affecting CRISPR immune response.

Multiple Cas1 proteins have been characterised and their structures resolved. Cas1 proteins have diverse amino acid sequences. However, their crystal structures are similar and all purified Cas1 proteins are metal-dependent nucleases/integrases that bind to DNA in a sequence-independent manner. Representative Cas2 proteins have been characterised and possess either (single strand) ssRNA- or (double strand) dsDNA- specific endoribonuclease activity.

In the I-E system of E. coli, Cas1 and Cas2 form a complex where a Cas2 dimer bridges two Cas1 dimers. In this complex, Cas2 performs a non-enzymatic scaffolding role, binding double-stranded fragments of invading DNA, while Cas1 binds the single-stranded flanks of the DNA and catalyses their integration into CRISPR arrays. New spacers are usually added at the beginning of the CRISPR next to the leader sequence creating a chronological record of viral infections. In E. coli a histone like protein called integration host factor (IHF), which binds to the leader sequence, is responsible for the accuracy of this integration. IHF also enhances integration efficiency in the type I-F system of Pectobacterium atrosepticum, but in other systems, different host factors may be required

==== Protospacer adjacent motifs (PAM) ====
Bioinformatic analysis of regions of phage genomes that were excised as spacers (termed protospacers) revealed that they were not randomly selected but instead were found adjacent to short (3–5 bp) DNA sequences termed protospacer adjacent motifs (PAM). Analysis of CRISPR-Cas systems showed PAMs to be important for type I and type II, but not type III systems during acquisition. In type I and type II systems, protospacers are excised at positions adjacent to a PAM sequence, with the other end of the spacer cut using a ruler mechanism, thus maintaining the regularity of the spacer size in the CRISPR array. The conservation of the PAM sequence differs between CRISPR-Cas systems and appears to be evolutionarily linked to Cas1 and the leader sequence.

New spacers are added to a CRISPR array in a directional manner, occurring preferentially, but not exclusively, adjacent to the leader sequence. Analysis of the type I-E system from E. coli demonstrated that the first direct repeat adjacent to the leader sequence is copied, with the newly acquired spacer inserted between the first and second direct repeats.

The PAM sequence appears to be important during spacer insertion in type I-E systems. That sequence contains a strongly conserved final nucleotide (nt) adjacent to the first nt of the protospacer. This nt becomes the final base in the first direct repeat. This suggests that the spacer acquisition machinery generates single-stranded overhangs in the second-to-last position of the direct repeat and in the PAM during spacer insertion. However, not all CRISPR-Cas systems appear to share this mechanism as PAMs in other organisms do not show the same level of conservation in the final position. It is likely that in those systems, a blunt end is generated at the very end of the direct repeat and the protospacer during acquisition.

==== Insertion variants ====
Analysis of Sulfolobus solfataricus CRISPRs revealed further complexities to the canonical model of spacer insertion, as one of its six CRISPR loci inserted new spacers randomly throughout its CRISPR array, as opposed to inserting closest to the leader sequence.

Multiple CRISPRs contain many spacers to the same phage. The mechanism that causes this phenomenon was discovered in the type I-E system of E. coli. A significant enhancement in spacer acquisition was detected where spacers already target the phage, even mismatches to the protospacer. This 'priming' requires the Cas proteins involved in both acquisition and interference to interact with each other. Newly acquired spacers that result from the priming mechanism are always found on the same strand as the priming spacer. This observation led to the hypothesis that the acquisition machinery slides along the foreign DNA after priming to find a new protospacer.

=== Biogenesis ===
CRISPR-RNA (crRNA), which later guides the Cas nuclease to the target during the interference step, must be generated from the CRISPR sequence. The crRNA is initially transcribed as part of a single long transcript encompassing much of the CRISPR array. This transcript is then cleaved by Cas proteins to form crRNAs. The mechanism to produce crRNAs differs among CRISPR-Cas systems. In type I-E and type I-F systems, the proteins Cas6e and Cas6f respectively, recognise stem-loops created by the pairing of identical repeats that flank the crRNA. These Cas proteins cleave the longer transcript at the edge of the paired region, leaving a single crRNA along with a small remnant of the paired repeat region.

Type III systems also use Cas6, however, their repeats do not produce stem-loops. Cleavage instead occurs by the longer transcript wrapping around the Cas6 to allow cleavage just upstream of the repeat sequence.

Type II systems lack the Cas6 gene and instead utilize RNaseIII for cleavage. Functional type II systems encode an extra small RNA that is complementary to the repeat sequence, known as a trans-activating crRNA (tracrRNA). Transcription of the tracrRNA and the primary CRISPR transcript results in base pairing and the formation of dsRNA at the repeat sequence, which is subsequently targeted by RNaseIII to produce crRNAs. Unlike the other two systems, the crRNA does not contain the full spacer, which is instead truncated at one end.

CrRNAs associate with Cas proteins to form ribonucleotide complexes that recognize foreign nucleic acids. CrRNAs show no preference between the coding and non-coding strands, which is indicative of an RNA-guided DNA-targeting system. The type I-E complex (commonly referred to as Cascade) requires five Cas proteins bound to a single crRNA.

=== Interference ===
During the interference stage in type I systems, the PAM sequence is recognized on the crRNA-complementary strand and is required along with crRNA annealing. In type I systems correct base pairing between the crRNA and the protospacer signals a conformational change in Cascade that recruits Cas3 for DNA degradation.

Type II systems rely on a single multifunctional protein, Cas9, for the interference step. Cas9 requires both the crRNA and the tracrRNA to function and cleave DNA using its dual HNH and RuvC/RNaseH-like endonuclease domains. Basepairing between the PAM and the phage genome is required in type II systems. However, the PAM is recognized on the same strand as the crRNA (the opposite strand to type I systems).

Type III systems, like type I require six or seven Cas proteins binding to crRNAs. The type III systems analysed from S. solfataricus and P. furiosus both target the mRNA of phages rather than phage DNA genome, which may make these systems uniquely capable of targeting RNA-based phage genomes. Type III systems were also found to target DNA in addition to RNA using a different Cas protein in the complex, Cas10. The DNA cleavage was shown to be transcription dependent.

The mechanism for distinguishing self from foreign DNA during interference is built into the crRNAs and is therefore likely common to all three systems. Throughout the distinctive maturation process of each major type, all crRNAs contain a spacer sequence and some portion of the repeat at one or both ends. It is the partial repeat sequence that prevents the CRISPR-Cas system from targeting the chromosome as base pairing beyond the spacer sequence signals self and prevents DNA cleavage. RNA-guided CRISPR enzymes are classified as type V restriction enzymes.

== Evolution ==
CRISPR associated protein Cas2 (adaptation RNase)
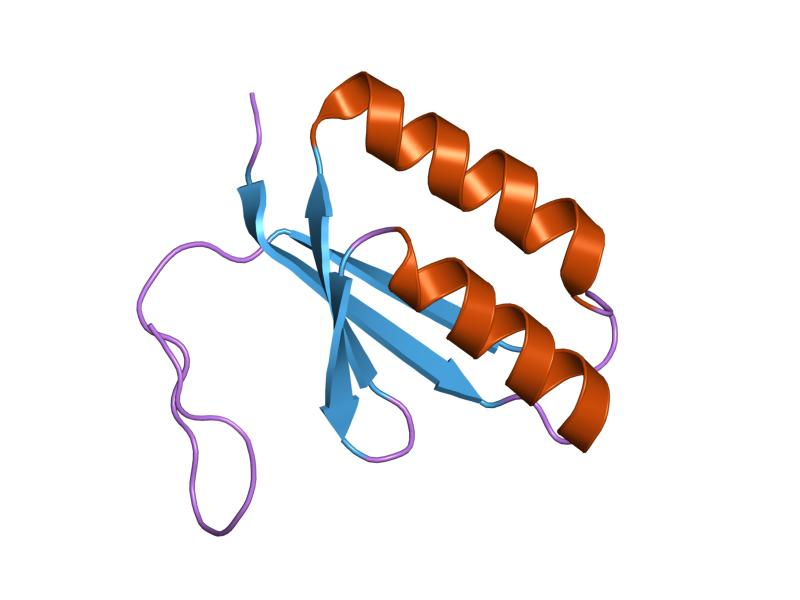
- Crystal structure of a hypothetical protein tt1823 from Thermus thermophilus

Identifiers
- Symbol: CRISPR_Cas2
- Pfam: PF09827
- InterPro: IPR019199
- CDD: cd09638
Available protein structures:
- PDB: IPR019199 PF09827 (ECOD; PDBsum)
- AlphaFold: IPR019199; PF09827

CRISPR-associated protein CasA/Cse1 (Type I effector DNase)

Identifiers
- Symbol: CRISPR_Cse1
- Pfam: PF09481
- InterPro: IPR013381
- CDD: cd09729
Available protein structures:
- PDB: IPR013381 PF09481 (ECOD; PDBsum)
- AlphaFold: IPR013381; PF09481

CRISPR associated protein CasC/Cse3/Cas6 (Type I effector RNase)
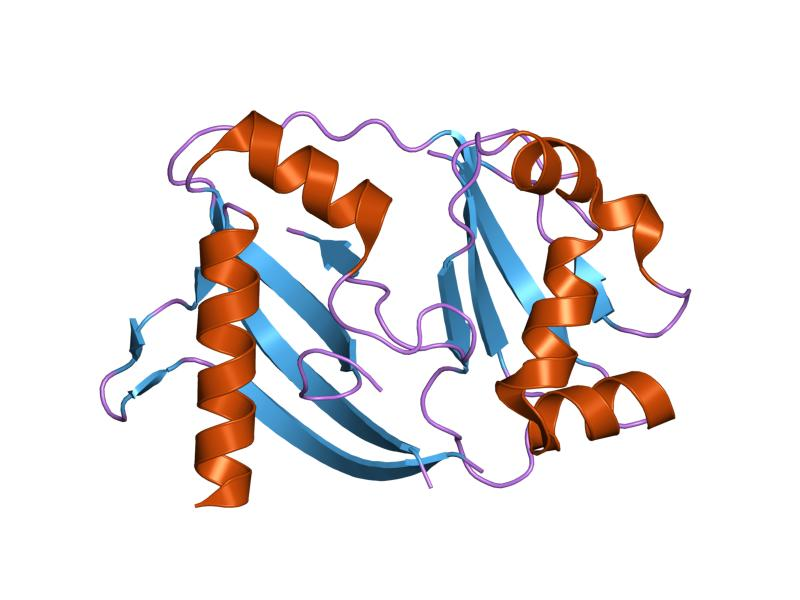
- Crystal structure of a crispr-associated protein from Thermus thermophilus

Identifiers
- Symbol: CRISPR_assoc
- Pfam: PF08798
- Pfam clan: CL0362
- InterPro: IPR010179
- CDD: cd09727
Available protein structures:
- PDB: IPR010179 PF08798 (ECOD; PDBsum)
- AlphaFold: IPR010179; PF08798

The cas genes in the adaptor and effector modules of the CRISPR-Cas system are believed to have evolved from two different ancestral modules. A transposon-like element called casposon encoding the Cas1-like integrase and potentially other components of the adaptation module was inserted next to the ancestral effector module, which likely functioned as an independent innate immune system. The highly conserved cas1 and cas2 genes of the adaptor module evolved from the ancestral module while a variety of class 1 effector cas genes evolved from the ancestral effector module. The evolution of these various class 1 effector module cas genes was guided by various mechanisms, such as duplication events. On the other hand, each type of class 2 effector module arose from subsequent independent insertions of mobile genetic elements. These mobile genetic elements took the place of the multiple gene effector modules to create single gene effector modules that produce large proteins which perform all the necessary tasks of the effector module. The spacer regions of CRISPR-Cas systems are taken directly from foreign mobile genetic elements and thus their long-term evolution is hard to trace. The non-random evolution of these spacer regions has been found to be highly dependent on the environment and the particular foreign mobile genetic elements it contains.

CRISPR-Cas can immunize bacteria against certain phages and thus halt transmission. For this reason, Koonin described CRISPR-Cas as a Lamarckian inheritance mechanism. However, this was disputed by a critic who noted, "We should remember [Lamarck] for the good he contributed to science, not for things that resemble his theory only superficially. Indeed, thinking of CRISPR and other phenomena as Lamarckian only obscures the simple and elegant way evolution really works". But as more recent studies have been conducted, it has become apparent that the acquired spacer regions of CRISPR-Cas systems are indeed a form of Lamarckian evolution because they are genetic mutations that are acquired and then passed on. On the other hand, the evolution of the Cas gene machinery that facilitates the system evolves through classic Darwinian evolution.

=== Coevolution ===
Analysis of CRISPR sequences revealed coevolution of host and viral genomes.

The basic model of CRISPR evolution is newly incorporated spacers driving phages to mutate their genomes to avoid the bacterial immune response, creating diversity in both the phage and host populations. To resist a phage infection, the sequence of the CRISPR spacer must correspond perfectly to the sequence of the target phage gene. Phages can continue to infect their hosts' given point mutations in the spacer. Similar stringency is required in PAM or the bacterial strain remains phage sensitive.

=== Rates ===
A study of 124 S. thermophilus strains showed that 26% of all spacers were unique and that different CRISPR loci showed different rates of spacer acquisition. Some CRISPR loci evolve more rapidly than others, which allowed the strains' phylogenetic relationships to be determined. A comparative genomic analysis showed that E. coli and S. enterica evolve much more slowly than S. thermophilus. The latter's strains that diverged 250,000 years ago still contained the same spacer complement.

Metagenomic analysis of two acid-mine-drainage biofilms showed that one of the analyzed CRISPRs contained extensive deletions and spacer additions versus the other biofilm, suggesting a higher phage activity/prevalence in one community than the other. In the oral cavity, a temporal study determined that 7–22% of spacers were shared over 17 months within an individual while less than 2% were shared across individuals.

From the same environment, a single strain was tracked using PCR primers specific to its CRISPR system. Broad-level results of spacer presence/absence showed significant diversity. However, this CRISPR added three spacers over 17 months, suggesting that even in an environment with significant CRISPR diversity some loci evolve slowly.

CRISPRs were analysed from the metagenomes produced for the Human Microbiome Project. Although most were body-site specific, some within a body site are widely shared among individuals. One of these loci originated from streptococcal species and contained ≈15,000 spacers, 50% of which were unique. Similar to the targeted studies of the oral cavity, some showed little evolution over time.

CRISPR evolution was studied in chemostats using S. thermophilus to directly examine spacer acquisition rates. In one week, S. thermophilus strains acquired up to three spacers when challenged with a single phage. During the same interval, the phage developed single-nucleotide polymorphisms that became fixed in the population, suggesting that targeting had prevented phage replication absent these mutations.

Another S. thermophilus experiment showed that phages can infect and replicate in hosts that have only one targeting spacer. Yet another showed that sensitive hosts can exist in environments with high-phage titres. The chemostat and observational studies suggest many nuances to CRISPR and phage (co)evolution.

== Identification ==
CRISPRs are widely distributed among bacteria and archaea and show some sequence similarities. Their most notable characteristic is their repeating spacers and direct repeats. This characteristic makes CRISPRs easily identifiable in long sequences of DNA, since the number of repeats decreases the likelihood of a false positive match.

Analysis of CRISPRs in metagenomic data is more challenging, as CRISPR loci do not typically assemble, due to their repetitive nature or through strain variation, which confuses assembly algorithms. Where many reference genomes are available, polymerase chain reaction (PCR) can be used to amplify CRISPR arrays and analyse spacer content. However, this approach yields information only for specifically targeted CRISPRs and for organisms with sufficient representation in public databases to design reliable polymerase PCR primers. Degenerate repeat-specific primers can be used to amplify CRISPR spacers directly from environmental samples; amplicons containing two or three spacers can be then computationally assembled to reconstruct long CRISPR arrays.

The alternative is to extract and reconstruct CRISPR arrays from shotgun metagenomic data. This is computationally more difficult, particularly with second generation sequencing technologies (e.g. 454, Illumina), as the short read lengths prevent more than two or three repeat units appearing in a single read. CRISPR identification in raw reads has been achieved using purely de novo identification or by using direct repeat sequences in partially assembled CRISPR arrays from contigs (overlapping DNA segments that together represent a consensus region of DNA) and direct repeat sequences from published genomes as a hook for identifying direct repeats in individual reads.

== Use by phages ==
Another way for bacteria to defend against phage infection is by having chromosomal islands. A subtype of chromosomal islands called phage-inducible chromosomal island (PICI) is excised from a bacterial chromosome upon phage infection and can inhibit phage replication. PICIs are induced, excised, replicated, and finally packaged into small capsids by certain staphylococcal temperate phages. PICIs use several mechanisms to block phage reproduction. In the first mechanism, PICI-encoded Ppi differentially blocks phage maturation by binding or interacting specifically with phage TerS, hence blocking phage TerS/TerL complex formation responsible for phage DNA packaging. In the second mechanism PICI CpmAB redirects the phage capsid morphogenetic protein to make 95% of SaPI-sized capsid and phage DNA can package only 1/3rd of their genome in these small capsids and hence become nonviable phage. The third mechanism involves two proteins, PtiA and PtiB, that target the LtrC, which is responsible for the production of virion and lysis proteins. This interference mechanism is modulated by a modulatory protein, PtiM, binds to one of the interference-mediating proteins, PtiA, and hence achieves the required level of interference.

One study showed that lytic ICP1 phage, which specifically targets Vibrio cholerae serogroup O1, has acquired a CRISPR-Cas system that targets a V. cholera PICI-like element. The system has 2 CRISPR loci and 9 Cas genes. It seems to be homologous to the I-F system found in Yersinia pestis. Moreover, like the bacterial CRISPR-Cas system, ICP1 CRISPR-Cas can acquire new sequences, which allows phage and host to co-evolve.

Certain archaeal viruses were shown to carry mini-CRISPR arrays containing one or two spacers. It has been shown that spacers within the virus-borne CRISPR arrays target other viruses and plasmids, suggesting that mini-CRISPR arrays represent a mechanism of heterotypic superinfection exclusion and participate in interviral conflicts.

== Applications ==
CRISPR gene editing is a revolutionary technology that allows for precise, targeted modifications to the DNA of living organisms. Developed from a natural defense mechanism found in bacteria, CRISPR-Cas9 is the most commonly used system. Gene editing with CRISPR-Cas9 involves a Cas9 nuclease and an engineered guide RNA, which come together to allow for the precise "cutting" of one or both strands of DNA at specific locations within the genome. It makes use of the cell's natural DNA repair systems, including non-homologous end joining, homology-directed repair, or mismatch repair, to modify, insert, or delete genetic material at these specific cut sites. This technology has transformed fields such as genetics, medicine, and agriculture, offering potential treatments for genetic disorders, advancements in crop engineering, and research into the fundamental workings of life. However, its ethical implications and potential unintended consequences have sparked significant debate.

== Experiences with CRISPR ==
In February of 2025 the first case of CRISPR gene editing therapy on a child was documented. It was used to treat Severe Carbamoyl Phosphate Synthetase 1 Deficiency. It was administered At Children's Hospital of Philadelphia and is currently successful in its use to counteract the disease.

== See also ==
- CRISPR activation
- Anti-CRISPR
- CRISPR/Cas Tools
- CRISPR gene editing
- The CRISPR Journal
- "Designer baby"
- DNA-guided CRISPR
- DRACO
- Gene knockout
- Genome-wide CRISPR-Cas9 knockout screens
- Glossary of genetics
- Human germline engineering
- Human Nature (2019 documentary film)
- MAGESTIC
- New eugenics
- Prime editing
- RNAi
- SiRNA
- Surveyor nuclease assay
- Synthetic biology
- Zinc finger
