= Trans-activating crRNA =

Biological molecule

In molecular biology, trans-activating CRISPR RNA (tracrRNA) is a small trans-encoded RNA. It was first discovered by Emmanuelle Charpentier in her study of the human pathogen Streptococcus pyogenes. In bacteria and archaea, CRISPR-Cas (clustered, regularly interspaced short palindromic repeats/CRISPR-associated proteins) constitute an RNA-mediated defense system that protects against viruses and plasmids. This defensive pathway has three steps. First, a copy of the invading nucleic acid is integrated into the CRISPR locus. Next, CRISPR RNAs (crRNAs) are transcribed from this CRISPR locus. The crRNAs are then incorporated into effector complexes, where the crRNA guides the complex to the invading nucleic acid and the Cas proteins degrade this nucleic acid. There are several CRISPR system subtypes.

Type II CRISPR-Cas systems require a tracrRNA which plays a role in the maturation of crRNA. The tracrRNA is partially complementary to and base pairs with a pre-crRNA forming an RNA duplex. This is cleaved by RNase III, an RNA-specific ribonuclease, to form a crRNA/tracrRNA hybrid. This hybrid acts as a guide for the endonuclease Cas9, which cleaves the invading nucleic acid.

== See also ==
- CRISPR
