= Lei Stanley Qi =

Chemical and systems biology researcher

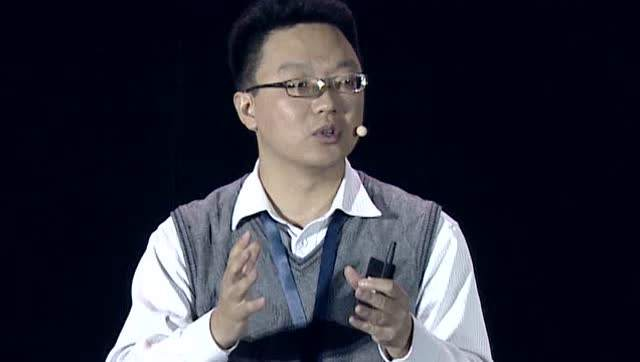
- Born: Qi Lei (亓磊); Shandong, China
- Education: Tsinghua University (B.A.); UC Berkeley (Ph.D.)
- Known for: CRISPRi, dCas9，CRISPR imaging，CRISPR-GO
- Awards: Sloan Research Fellowship (2017); Pew Scholar (2016); NIH Directors Early Independence Award (2013)
- Scientific career
- Fields: Genome engineering, Synthetic Biology
- Workplaces: Stanford, Chemical and Systems Biology
- Academic advisors: Adam Arkin, Jennifer Doudna
- Website: med.stanford.edu/qilab.html; qi.ucsf.edu

Lei "Stanley" Qi (Chinese: 亓磊; pinyin: Qí Lěi) is an associate professor in the department of bioengineering, and the department of chemical and systems biology at Stanford University. Qi led the development of the first catalytically dead Cas9 lacking endonuclease activity (dCas9), which is the basis for CRISPR interference (CRISPRi). His laboratory subsequently developed CRISPR-Genome Organization (CRISPR-GO) based on dCas9 and CRISPR-Transcriptome Organization (CRISPR-TO) based on dCas13.

Qi is a co-inventor of the University of California patent on the CRISPR gene-editing technology.

== Early life and education ==
Qi obtained his B.S. in physics and math from Tsinghua University, China, Master in physics from UC Berkeley, and PhD in bioengineering from UC Berkeley. During his PhD work at Berkeley, he studied synthetic biology with Adam Arkin, and was the first to explore engineering the CRISPR for targeted gene editing and gene regulation with Jennifer Doudna. After PhD, he performed independent research work as a faculty fellow at UCSF. He joined the Stanford faculty in 2014.

== Award ==
Qi has won awards, including NIH Director's Early Independence Award, Pew Biomedical Scholar, and Alfred. P. Sloan Fellowship.
