= BLESS =

Method used to detect DNA damage

BLESS, also known as breaks labeling, enrichment on streptavidin and next-generation sequencing, is a method used to detect genome-wide double-strand DNA damage. In contrast to chromatin immunoprecipitation (ChIP)-based methods of identifying DNA double-strand breaks (DSBs) by labeling DNA repair proteins, BLESS utilizes biotinylated DNA linkers to directly label genomic DNA in situ which allows for high-specificity enrichment of samples on streptavidin beads and the subsequent sequencing-based DSB mapping to nucleotide resolution.

== Workflow ==
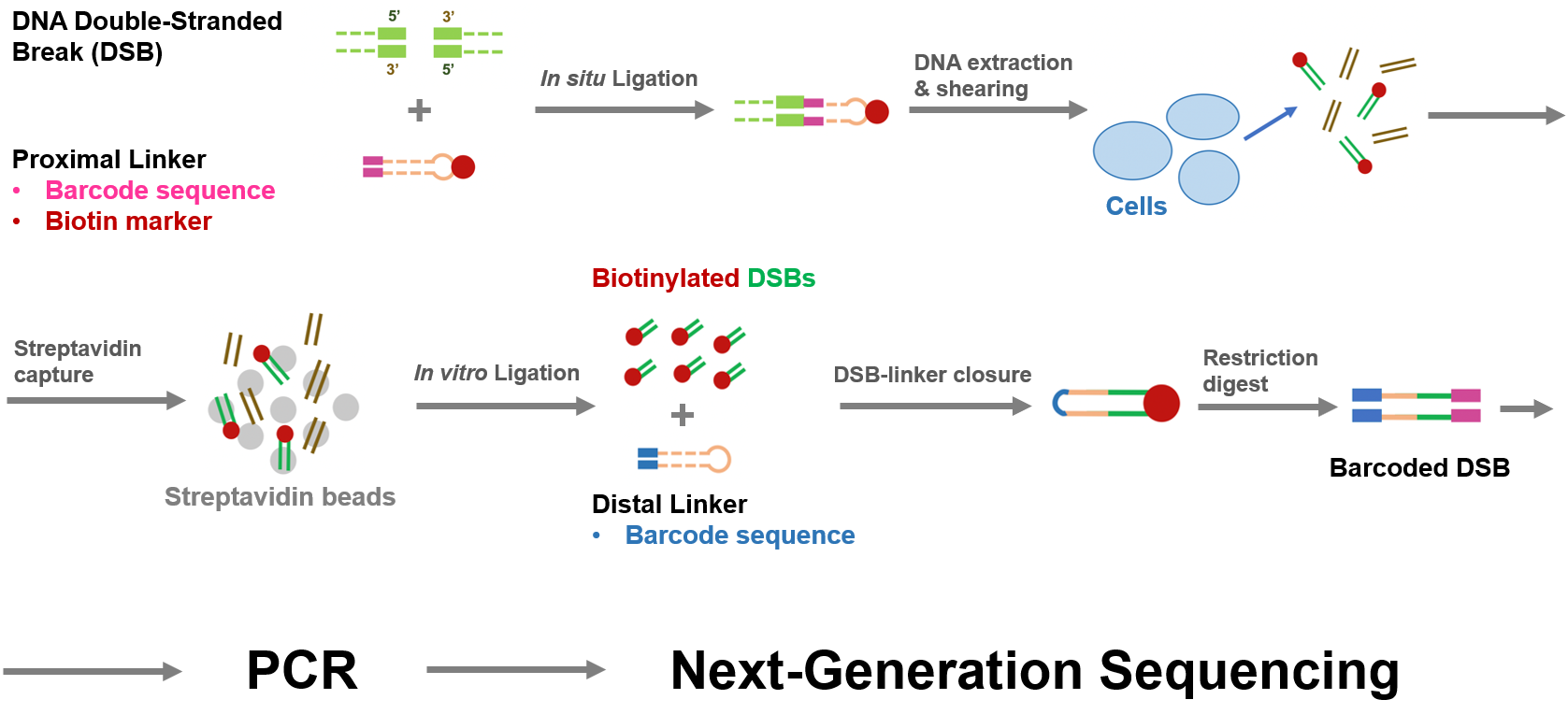
BLESS workflow. 1) Double-stranded DNA breaks (DSBs) are labeled in situ with proximal DNA hairpin linkers containing a biotin marker. 2) Cells are fixed, lysed and treated with proteinases for extraction and subsequent shearing of genomic DNA (gDNA). 3) Labeled and unlabeled gDNA fragments are passed through streptavidin-derived beads, which capture the labeled fragments with high specificity due to the strong affinity of biotin markers to streptavidin. 4) After passage through streptavidin beads, unlabeled gDNA fragments are removed, leaving the enriched biotin-labeled gDNA fragments. 5) Distal linker is ligated to labeled gDNA fragments at the free end. 6) I-SceI endonuclease cuts linkers at the restriction site to release gDNA fragments from biotin. 7) Barcode-specific primers are used for amplification of enriched fragments by Polymerase Chain Reaction (PCR). 8) Next-Generation Sequencing of PCR products is then used for single nucleotide-resolution analysis of DSBs in the genome.

=== Biotinylated linker design ===
The biotinylated linker is designed to form a hairpin structure that specifically labels DSBs and not single-strand DNA breaks. The linker has a blunt, ligatable end with a known barcode sequence that labels the site of ligation as well as an XhoI restriction enzyme recognition site adjacent to the barcode. The hairpin loop of the linker is covalently bound to a biotin molecule, allowing for subsequent enrichment of labeled DNA with streptavidin beads.

Use of biotin labels allows for specific binding without disruption of DNA due to the small size of the marker. Because biotin also has high affinity to streptavidin, further highly specific purification can be performed on streptavidin beads.

=== Nuclei purification and in situ labeling ===
Following the induction of DSBs, cells are fixed with formaldehyde, lysed, and treated with proteinases to purify intact nuclei. The initial fixation step stabilizes chromatin and prevents the formation of additional DSBs during sample preparation. DSBs are then blunted and incubated with biotinylated linkers in the presence of T4 DNA ligase. T4 ligase does not recognize single-stranded breaks, and as such directly labels the DSB sites through covalent attachment of the biotinylated linker.

=== DNA extraction, fragmentation, and purification ===
Labeled genomic DNA is extracted from nuclei and fragmented by HaeIII restriction enzyme digestion and sonication. Labeled DNA fragments are then purified using beads derived from streptavidin, a biotin-binding protein found in the bacterium Streptomyces avidinii. Because the interaction of streptavidin and biotin is strong and highly specific, purification of sample on streptavidin-coated beads allows for robust enrichment of labeled DNA fragments.

=== Distal linker DNA labeling and digestion ===
A second labeling step occurs after fragmentation and biotin-streptavidin affinity purification to attach primer binding sites to the free end of the captured DNA. Similar to the first labeling step, T4 DNA ligase is used to attach a distal linker to the unlabeled end of the DNA. The distal linker also has an XhoI restriction enzyme recognition site but is not covalently bound to a biotin molecule. Once the distal linker is attached, the captured DNA fragments are digested using I-SceI endonucleases that cut both the biotinylated linkers and the distal linkers to release the DNA fragments.

=== PCR amplification and sequencing ===
The digested DNA strands are amplified using PCR with primers complementary to barcode sequences in the biotinylated linker and the distal linker. The amplified DNA is further processed by digesting with XhoI restriction enzymes to remove the I-SceI ends and purified prior to sequencing. Although use of next-generation sequencing methods is recommended for BLESS analysis, Sanger sequencing has also been shown to generate successful, albeit less robust results.

== Computational analysis ==
The BLESS sequencing reads can be analyzed using the Instant Sequencing (iSeq) software suite. To detect sites of DSBs, reads are aligned to a reference genome using bowtie to determine the chromosome positions. The genome is divided into intervals and hypergeometric tests are used to identify intervals enriched with mapped reads. DSBs are identified by comparing enrichment in treated samples versus a control. A statistically significant increase in a DNA damage-induced sample suggests that the DNA at this interval is fragile and enriched in DSBs.

== Advantages ==
1. Use of biotinylated DNA linkers designed to specifically recognize double-stranded DNA breaks allows for a less biased, more direct survey of the breakome without the need to rely on native and/or DSB-proxy proteins, such as the phosphorylated histone variant H2A.X (γH2A.X), in the cell. Because of this, BLESS can be utilized in a variety of cells from different organisms.
2. For the same reason, BLESS is also sensitive to multiple sources of double-stranded breaks, such as chemical and physical DNA disruption, replication fork stalling, as well as presence of telomere ends. This makes BLESS suitable for analysis of cells at various conditions.
3. Labeling of DSBs occurs in situ, reducing the risk of false positives form detection of DNA breaks due to mechanical shearing and chemical sample treatment.

== Limitations ==
1. Due to specificity of the linker design, biotinylated markers can only label double-stranded DNA breaks at blunt, not cohesive ends, leading to less efficient ligation.
2. Compared to newer breakome survey methods, such as BLISS, BLESS requires large amounts of cellular starting material for successful analysis, resulting in tedious and time-consuming sample preparation and processing. To process 24 samples, the BLESS protocol requires 60 work-hours over the course of 15 days whereas BLISS requires 12 work-hours over 5 days.
3. Because cells require chemical fixation prior to DNA extraction, BLESS is prone to high background noise from fixation artifacts. However, stringent custom optimization has been shown to reduce this issue.
4. Due to the lack of PCR controls, BLESS is not a fully quantitative method and is prone to amplification bias, resulting in poor scalability.
5. BLESS is only suitable for detecting double-stranded breaks at one specific time in the genome, as compared to continuous analysis.

== Alternative methods ==
Breaks labeling in situ and sequencing (BLISS)
In BLISS, cells or tissue sections are attached to a cover glass first before DSB labeling. This allows some centrifugation steps to be omitted, thus decreasing the number of artificial DSBs introduced from sample preparation, and reducing sample loss. Importantly, it allows a much smaller amount of starting material to be used compared to BLESS. Another improvement is the use of in vitro transcription to generate and amplify RNA sequences for library preparation. BLISS uses T7 bacteriophage-mediated transcription rather than PCR, reducing errors caused by PCR amplification bias that occur with BLESS.
Immobilized-BLESS (i-BLESS)
A limitation of the original BLESS method is that it is problematic in application to smaller cells such as yeast cells. While low centrifugation speeds employed during nuclei isolation are not efficient enough for small cells, increasing centrifugation speeds can shear the genomic DNA. However, in i-BLESS, cells are immobilized in agarose beads prior to DSB labeling. This allows the use of higher centrifugation speeds without artificial DNA shearing. The remainder of the DSB labeling procedure follows that of the BLESS method, and labeled DNA fragments are recovered from the agarose beads prior to the streptavidin capture step. The i-BLESS method is not limited to yeast and can theoretically be applied to all cells.
DSBCapture
Similar to BLESS, DSBCapture uses biotinylated adapters to label DSBs in situ and streptavidin beads to isolate labeled DNA fragments for amplification and sequencing. While labeling in BLESS relies on blunt-end ligation, DSBCapture uses more efficient cohesive-end ligation to attach biotinylated modified Illumina adapters. In addition, DSBCapture relies on fewer PCR steps compared to BLESS, reducing amplification bias. This method also generates libraries with higher sequence diversity than BLESS, eliminating the need to spike in other libraries to improve diversity prior to sequencing. Furthermore, DSBCapture uses single-end sequencing in contrast to BLESS where sequencing can begin from both ends. Single-end sequencing results reflect only the sequences of DSB sites, improving data yield.
GUIDE-Seq
Also known as Genome-Wide Unbiased Identification of DSBs Enabled by Sequencing, GUIDE-Seq uses the incorporation of double-stranded oligodeoxynucleotide (dsODN) sequences to label sites of DSBs in living cells. It allows DSBs to be labeled over an extended time period, and the sites of DNA damage identified through GUIDE-Seq reflect accumulated DSBs. In contrast, BLESS only labels and detects transient DSBs that exist when the cells were fixed.

== Applications ==
While double-stranded breaks in the DNA can be caused by various sources of disruption, they are often observed at high frequency during apoptosis and can contribute to genome instability, resulting in oncogenic mutations. For this reason, high-resolution, specific DSB-mapping methods like BLESS are useful for breakome surveys.

DSBs can be artificially induced using genome editing technologies such as CRISPR-Cas9 or TALEN. These technologies may lead to unintentional modifications of DNA at off-target locations on the genome. Since BLESS can identify the nucleotide position of DSBs, it can be used to determine if off-target genome editing has occurred and the location of DSBs unintentionally introduced by these nuclease systems.
