= GUIDE-Seq =

GUIDE-Seq (Genome-wide, Unbiased Identification of DSBs Enabled by Sequencing) is a molecular biology technique that allows for the unbiased in vitro detection of off-target genome editing events in DNA caused by CRISPR/Cas9 as well as other RNA-guided nucleases in living cells. Similar to LAM-PCR, it employs multiple PCRs to amplify regions of interest that contain a specific insert that preferentially integrates into double-stranded breaks. As gene therapy is an emerging field, GUIDE-Seq has gained traction as a cheap method to detect the off-target effects of potential therapeutics without needing whole genome sequencing.

== Principles ==
Conceived to work in concert with next-gen sequencing platforms such as Illumina dye sequencing, GUIDE-Seq relies on the integration of a blunt, double-stranded oligodeoxynucleotide (dsODN) that has been phosphothioated on two of the phosphate linkages on the 5' end of both strands. The dsODN cassette integrates into any site in the genome that contains a double-stranded break (DSB). This means that along with the target and off-target sites that may exist as a result of the activity of a nuclease, the dsODN cassette will also integrate into any spurious sites in the genome that have a DSB. This makes it critical to have a dsODN only condition that controls for errant and naturally occurring DSBs, and is required to use the GUIDE-seq bioinformatic pipeline.

After integration of the dsODN cassette, genomic DNA (gDNA) is extracted from the cell culture and sheared to 500bp fragments via sonication. The resulting sheared gDNA undergoes end-repair and adapter ligation. From here, DNA specifically containing the dsODN insert is amplified via two rounds of polymerase chain reaction (PCR) that proceeds in a unidirectional manner starting from the primers that are complementary to the dsODN. This process allows for the reading of the adjacent sequences, both the sense and anti-sense strands, flanking the insert. The final product is a panoply of amplicons, describing the DSB distribution, containing indices for sample differentiation, p5 and p7 Illumina flow-cell adapters, and the sequences flanking the dsODN cassette.

GUIDE-Seq is able to achieve detection of rare DSBs that occur with a 0.1% frequency, however this may be as a result of the limitations of next-generation sequencing platforms. The greater the depth of reads an instrument is able to achieve, the better it can detect rarer events. Additionally, GUIDE-Seq is able to detect sites not predicted by the "in silico" methods which often will predict sites based on sequence similarity and percent mismatch. There have been cases of GUIDE-Seq not detecting any off-targets for certain guide RNAs, suggesting that some RNA-guided nucleases may have no associated off-targets. GUIDE-Seq has been used to show that engineered variants of Cas9 can have reduced off-target effects.

=== Caveats ===
GUIDE-Seq has been shown to miss some off-targets, when compared to the genome-wide sequencing DIGENOME-Seq method, due to the nature of its targeting. Another caveat is that GUIDE-Seq has been observed to generate slightly different off-target sites depending on the cell line. This could be due to cell lines having different parental genetic origins, cell line specific mutations, or, in the case of some immortal cell lines such as K562s, having aneuploidy. This suggests that it would be pertinent for researchers to test multiple cell lines to validate efficacy and accuracy. GUIDE-Seq cannot be used to identify off-targets in vivo.
