= XhoI =

Restriction enzyme

Identifiers
- Symbol: XhoI
- Pfam: PF04555
- InterPro: IPR007636
Available protein structures:
- PDB: IPR007636 PF04555 (ECOD; PDBsum)
- AlphaFold: IPR007636; PF04555

In molecular biology, XhoI is a type II restriction enzymes that recognise the double-stranded DNA sequence CTCGAG and cleaves after C-1. Type II restriction endonucleases are components of prokaryotic DNA restriction-modification mechanisms that protect the organism against invading foreign DNA. These site-specific deoxyribonucleases catalyse the endonucleolytic cleavage of DNA to give specific double-stranded fragments with terminal 5'-phosphates.
