= CRISPR activation =

Type of CRISPR tool

CRISPR activation (CRISPRa) is a genetic perturbation technique that utilizes an engineered form of the CRISPR-Cas9 system to enhance the expression of specific genes without altering the underlying DNA sequence. Unlike traditional CRISPR-Cas9, which introduces double-strand breaks to edit genes, CRISPRa employs a modified, catalytically inactive Cas9 (dCas9) fused with transcriptional activators to target promoter or enhancer regions, thereby boosting gene transcription. This method allows for precise control of gene expression, making it a valuable tool for studying gene function, creating gene regulatory networks, and developing potential therapeutic interventions for a variety of diseases.

Like for CRISPR interference, the CRISPR effector is guided to the target by a complementary guide RNA. However, CRISPR activation systems are fused to transcriptional activators to increase expression of genes of interest. Such systems are usable for many purposes including but not limited to, genetic screens and overexpression of proteins of interest. The most commonly used effectors are based on Cas9 (from Type II systems), but effectors based on other CRISPR-associated proteins, such as Cas12a (Type V), have been engineered as well.

== Components ==
=== dCas9 ===
Cas9 Endonuclease Dead, also known as dead Cas9 or dCas9, is a mutant form of Cas9 whose endonuclease activity is removed through point mutations in its endonuclease domains. Similar to its unmutated form, dCas9 is used in CRISPR systems along with gRNAs to target specific genes or nucleotides complementary to the gRNA with PAM sequences that allow Cas9 to bind. Cas9 ordinarily has 2 endonuclease domains called the RuvC and HNH domains. The point mutations D10A and H840A change 2 important residues for endonuclease activity that ultimately results in its deactivation. Although dCas9 lacks endonuclease activity, it is still capable of binding to its guide RNA and the DNA strand that is being targeted because such binding is managed by other domains. This alone is often enough to attenuate if not outright block transcription of the targeted gene if the gRNA positions dCas9 in a way that prevents transcriptional factors and RNA polymerase from accessing the DNA. However, this ability to bind DNA can also be exploited for activation since dCas9 has modifiable regions, typically the N and C terminus of the protein, that can be used to attach transcriptional activators.

=== Guide RNA ===
Complementary base pairing between the sgRNA and genomic DNA allows targeting of Cas9 or dCas9

A small guide RNA (sgRNA or gRNA) is an RNA with around 20 nucleotides used to direct Cas9 or dCas9 to their targets. gRNAs contain two major regions of importance for CRISPR systems: the scaffold and spacer regions. The spacer region has nucleotides that are complementary to those found on the target genes, often in the promoter region. The scaffold region is responsible for formation of a complex with (d)Cas9. Together, they bind (d)Cas9 and direct it to the gene(s) of interest. Since the spacer region of a gRNA can be modified for any potential sequence, they give CRISPR systems much more flexibility as any genes and nucleotides with a sequence complementary to the spacer region can become possible targets.

=== Transcriptional activators ===
Transcriptional Activators are protein domains or whole proteins linked to dCas9 or sgRNAs that assist in the recruitment of important co-factors as well as RNA Polymerase for transcription of the gene(s) targeted by the system. In order for a protein to be made from the gene that encodes it, RNA polymerase must make RNA from the DNA template of the gene during a process called transcription. Transcriptional activators have a DNA binding domain and a domain for activation of transcription. The activation domain can recruit general transcription factors or RNA polymerase to the gene sequence. Activation domains can also function by facilitating transcription by stalled RNA polymerases, and in eukaryotes can act to move nucleosomes on the DNA or modify histones to increase gene expression. These activators can be introduced into the system through attachment to dCas9 or to the sgRNA. Some researchers have noted that the extent of transcriptional upregulation can be modulated by using multiple sites for activator attachment in one experiment and by using different variations and combinations of activators at once in a given experiment or sample.

=== Expression system ===
An expression system is required for the introduction of the gRNAs and (d)Cas9 proteins into the cells of interest. Typically employed options include, but are not limited to, transfection of plasmids and viral vectors, such as adeno-associated virus (AAV) or lentivirus.

== Specific activation systems ==
=== VP64-p65-Rta ===
The dCas9-VPR activator increases transcription at the gene that it targets.

The VP64-p65-Rta, or VPR, dCas9 activator was created by modifying an existing dCas9 activator, in which a Vp64 transcriptional activator (four copies of Vp16) is joined to the C terminus of dCas9. In the dCas9-VPR protein, the transcription factors p65 and Rta are added to the C terminus of dCas9-Vp64. Therefore, all three transcription factors are targeted to the same gene. The use of three transcription factors, as opposed to solely Vp64, results in increased expression of targeted genes. When different genes were targeted by dCas9, they all showed significantly greater expression with dCas9-VPR than with dCas9-VP64. It has also been demonstrated that dCas9-VPR can be used to increase expression of multiple genes within the same cell by putting multiple sgRNAs into the same cell.

dCas9-VPR has been used to activate the NEUROG2 and NEUROD1 genes, resulting in differentiation of induced pluripotent stem cells into induced neurons. A study comparing dCas9 activators found that the VPR, SAM, and Suntag activators worked best with dCas9 to increase gene expression in a variety of fruit fly, mouse, and human cell types.

Similar systems utilizing dCas9 fused to other activators (like p300) or repressors (like KRAB) have also been developed.

=== Synergistic activation mediator ===
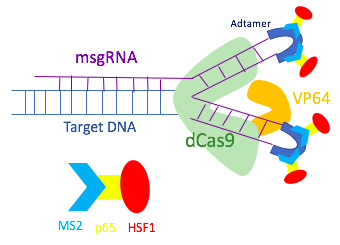
The dCas-SAM system uses msgRNA that has attached aptamers for different transcriptional factors (MS2,p65 and HSF1) to bind.

To overcome the limitation of the dCas9-VP64 gene activation system, the dCas9-SAM system was developed to incorporate multiple transcriptional factors. Utilizing MS2, p65, and HSF1 proteins, dCas9-SAM system recruits various transcriptional factors working synergistically to activate the gene of interest.

In order to assemble different transcriptional activators, the dCas9-SAM system uses a modified single guide RNA (sgRNA) that has binding sites for the MS2 protein. Hairpin aptamers are attached to the tetra loop and the stem loop 2 of the sgRNA to become binding sites for dimerized MS2 bacteriophage coat proteins. As the hairpins are exposed outside of the dCas9-sgRNA complex, other transcriptional factors can bind to the MS2 protein without disrupting the dCas9-sgRNA complex. Thus, the MS2 protein is engineered to include p65 and HSF1 proteins. The MS2-p65-HSF1 fusion protein interacts with the dCas9-VP64 to recruit more transcriptional factors onto the promoter of the target genes.

Using the dCas9-SAM system, Konermann et al. (2015) identified genes in melanoma cells that confer resistance to a BRAF inhibitor. In another study, Zhang et al. (2015) employed the dCas-SAM system in human cell lines to reactivate latent HIV provirus, triggering apoptosis of infected cells.

=== SunTag ===
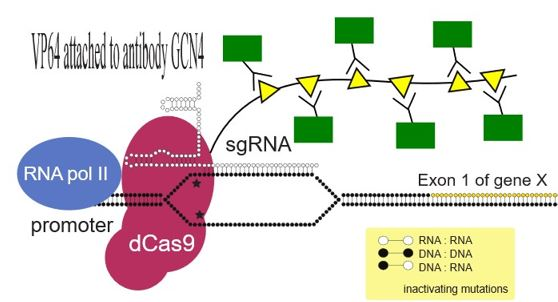
The use of the Suntag system allows multiple antibodies fused to VP64 to bind to dCas9-Suntag. That in turn recruits RNA polymerase and increases gene expression.

The SunTag activator system uses the dCas9 protein, which is modified to be linked with the SunTag. The SunTag is a repeating polypeptide array that can recruit multiple copies of antibodies. Through attaching transcriptional factors on the antibodies, the SunTag dCas9 activating complex amplifies its recruitment of transcriptional factors. In order to guide the dCas9 protein to its target gene, the dCas9 SunTag system uses sgRNA.

Tanenbaum et al.(2014) are credited for creating the dCas9 SunTag system. For the antibodies, they employed GCN4 antibodies which was bound to transcriptional factor VP64. In order to transport the antibodies to the nuclei of the cells, they attached NLS tag. To confirm the nuclear localization of the antibodies, sfGFP was used for visualization purpose. Therefore, the GCN4-sfGFP-NLS-VP64 protein was developed to be interact with dCas SunTag system. The antibodies successfully bound to SunTag polypeptides and activated target CXCR4 gene in K562 cell lines. Comparing with the dCas9-VP64 activation complex, they were able to increase the CXCR4 gene expression 5-25 times greater in K562 cell lines. Not only was there a greater CXCR4 protein overexpression but also CXCR4 proteins were active to further travel on the transwell migration assay. Thus, the dCas9-SunTag system can be used to activate genes that are present latently such as virus genes.

=== dCas9-p300 system ===
An alternative approach to CRISPR activation involves targeting epigenetic modifiers to specific genomic regions. Hilton et al. (2015) developed a system in which dCas9 is fused to the catalytic core domain of p300, a histone acetyltransferase. The dCas9–p300 fusion promotes acetylation of histone H3 at lysine 27 (H3K27ac) near targeted genomic sites, leading to transcriptional activation from promoters and proximal and distal enhancers. This approach provides a means of activating gene expression through targeted chromatin modification, rather than relying solely on the recruitment of conventional transcriptional activation domains. In the experimental contexts examined by Hilton et al. (2015), dCas9–p300 also enabled activation from enhancer regions that were less responsive to dCas9–VP64, demonstrating the potential of targeted histone acetylation as a strategy for CRISPR-mediated transcriptional activation.

=== Small molecule hybrid systems ===
Activation or repression of genes using dCas9 can also be done by recruiting a cell's own endogenous transcription activators or repressors. These systems require strategies that incorporate specially designed two-headed small molecules, dubbed chemical epigenetic modifiers (CEMs), and separate fusion proteins alongside dCas9 that cause induced proximity, and also allow for dose-dependent control of specific gene expression. These systems have been used to modulate genes such as CXCR4 and TP53. Similar strategies to induce repression utilize proteolysis targeting chimeras (PROTACs) combined with dCas9 for gene specificity.

== Applications ==
The dCas9 activation system allows a desired gene or multiple genes in the same cell to be expressed. It is possible to study genes involved in a certain process using a genome wide screen that involves activating expression of genes. Examining which sgRNAs yield a phenotype suggests which genes are involved in a specific pathway. The dCas9 activation system can be used to control exactly which cells are activated and at what time activation occurs. dCas9 constructs have been made that turn on a dCas9-activator fusion protein in the presence of light or chemicals. Cells can also be reprogrammed or differentiated from one cell type into another by increasing the expression of certain genes important for the formation or maintenance of a cell type.

=== Greater control over gene expression ===
One research group used a system in which dCas9 was fused to a particular domain, C1B1. When blue light is shined on the cell, the cryptochrome 2 (Cry2) domain binds to C1B1. The Cry2 domain is fused to a transcriptional activator, so blue light targets the activator to the spot where dCas9 is bound. The use of light allows a great deal of control over when the targeted gene is activated. Removing the light from the cell results in only dCas9 remaining at the target gene, so expression is not increased. In this way, the system is reversible. A similar system was developed using chemical control. In this system, dCas9 recruits an MS2 fusion protein that contains the domain FKBP. In the presence of the chemical RAP, an FRB domain fused to a chromatin modifying complex binds to FKBP. Whenever RAP is added to the cells, a specific chromatin modifier complex can be targeted to the gene. That allows scientists to examine how specific chromatin modifications affect the expression of a gene. The dCAs9-VPR system is used as an activator by targeting it to the promoter of a gene upstream of the coding region. A study used various sgRNAs to target different portions of the gene, finding that the dCas9-VPR activator can act as an activator or a repressor, depending on the location it binds. In a cell, sgRNAs targeting the promoter could allow dCas9-VPR to increase expression, while sgRNAs targeting the coding region of the gene result in dCas9-VPR decreasing expression.

=== Genome wide activation ===
The versatility of sgRNAs allows dCas9 activators to increase the expression of any gene within an organism's genome. That could be used to increase expression of a protein coding gene or a transcribed RNA. A paper demonstrated that genome wide activation could be used to determine which proteins are involved in mediated resistance to a specific drug. Another paper used genome wide activation of long, noncoding RNAs and observed that increasing the expression of certain long noncoding RNAs conferred resistance to the drug vemurafenib. In both cases, the cells that survive the drug could be studied to determine which sgRNAs they contain. That allows researchers to determine which gene was activated in each surviving cell, which suggests which genes are important for resistance to that drug.

=== Use in organisms ===
A dCas9 fusion with VP64, p65, and HSF1 (heat shock factor 1) allowed researchers to target genes in Arabidopsis thaliana and increase transcription to a similar level as when the gene itself is inserted into the plant's genome. For one of the two genes tested, the dCas9 activator changes the number and size of leaves and made the plants better able to handle drought. The authors conclude that the dCas9 activator can create phenotypes in plants that are similar to those observed when a transgene is inserted for overexpression. Researchers have used multiple guide RNAs to target dCas9 activation system to multiple genes in a specific mouse strain in which dCas9 can be turned on in specific cell lines using the Cre recombinase system. Scientists used the targeting and increased expression of several genes to examine the processes involved in regeneration and carcinomas of the liver.

== See also ==
- CRISPR interference
