= Cas9 =

Microbial protein found in Streptococcus pyogenes M1 GAS

CRISPR-associated endonuclease Cas9
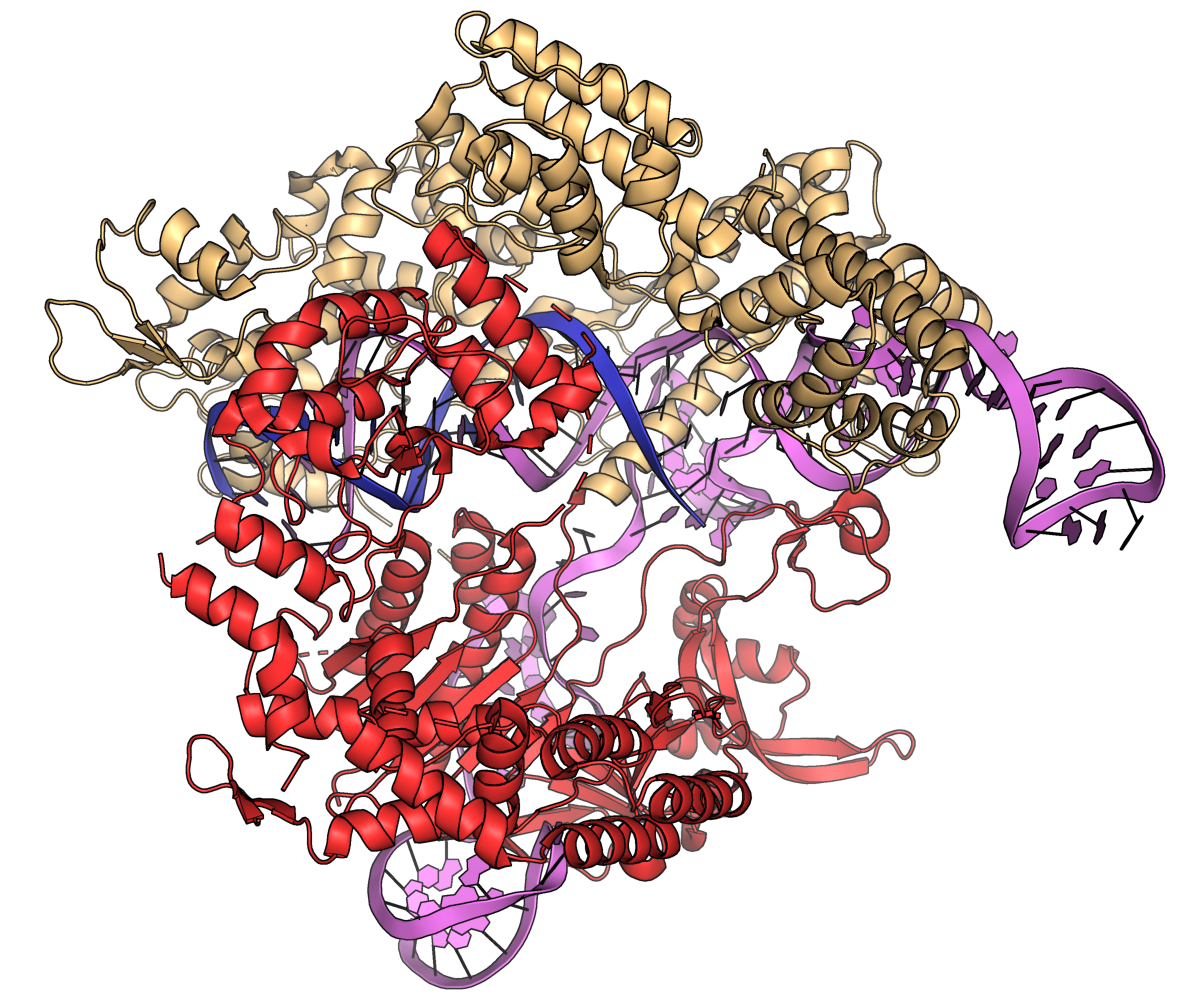
- S. pyogenes Cas9 in complex with sgRNA and its target DNA. PDB: 4OO8

Identifiers
- Organism: Streptococcus pyogenes M1
- Symbol: cas9
- Alt. symbols: SpCas9
- Entrez: 901176
- Orthologs: NCBI: entry; OMA: entry
- PDB: 4OO8
- RefSeq (mRNA): NC_002737.2
- RefSeq (Prot): NP_269215.1
- UniProt: Q99ZW2

Other data
- EC number: 3.1.-.-
- Chromosome: Genomic: 0.85 - 0.86 Mb
Search for
- Structures: Swiss-model
- Domains: InterPro

Cas9

Identifiers
- Symbol: ?
- InterPro: IPR028629
Available protein structures:
- PDB: IPR028629
- AlphaFold: IPR028629

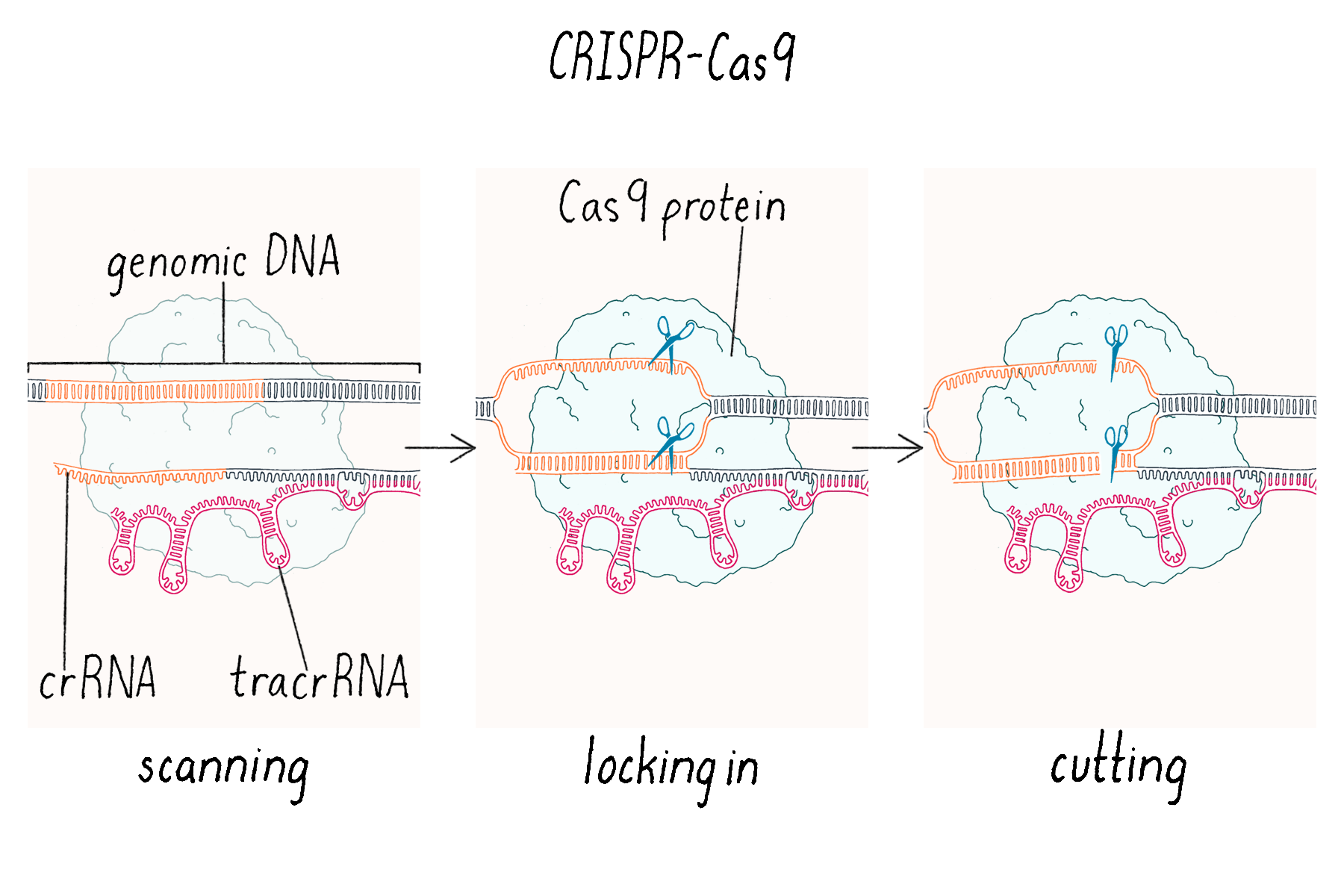
A DNA cutting enzyme (Cas9) and RNA complex (crRNA, tracrRNA) that work together to recognize and cut a very specific DNA sequence.

Cas9 (CRISPR-associated protein 9) is a DNA cutting endonuclease that is part of the CRISPR immune system in bacteria and archaea. It has been adapted for use as a CRISPR genome editing tool. The CRISPR-Cas9 system is widely used in genetic engineering, medicine, agriculture, and biotechnology.

The Cas9 endonuclease introduces site-specific double-stranded breaks in DNA, enabling gene inactivation, removal, or insertion through cellular repair mechanisms such as non-homologous end joining or homologous recombination.

Cas9 was discovered in Streptococcus pyogenes and later in S. thermophilus. It functions with two small RNAs—crRNA and tracrRNA—to form a four-component complex. In 2012, Doudna and Charpentier fused the RNAs into a single-guide RNA, enabling Cas9 to cut specific DNA sequences. These developments spurred genome modification efforts, including groups led by Zhang and Church who showed genome editing in human cells.

Variants of Cas9, including Cas9 nickase (Cas9n), that create single-strand breaks, and versions recognizing different PAM sequences, address specific Cas9 limitations.

CRISPR-Cas9 technology has raised ethical and regulatory concerns, particularly regarding human germline editing and genetic enhancement.

== History ==
The CRISPR/Cas system evolved in nature as a means for bacteria to protect themselves from invading viruses and bacteriophages by inserting pieces of their DNA into the host genome. This allowed the adaptive immune system to respond accordingly on a subsequent infection. It was discovered in Streptococcus pyogenes and later found across many other species.

Excerpt end

Development of Cas9 as a genome editing tool

Cas9 was first identified in Streptococcus pyogenes as a CRISPR-associated protein, originally referred to as Cas5, involved in the bacterial adaptive immune system. Studies found Cas9 contains a nuclease domain, the effector enzyme responsible for generating double-stranded DNA breaks in the type II CRISPR system.

Researchers identified that Cas9 activity depends on two RNA molecules: CRISPR RNA (crRNA), which guides the enzyme to target DNA sequences, and trans-activating CRISPR RNA (tracrRNA), which is required for nuclease activity.

In 2012, Jennifer Doudna and Emmanuelle Charpentier re-engineered the Cas9 endonuclease into a simplified two-component system by fusing the two RNA molecules into a single-guide RNA that, when combined with Cas9, could find and cut the DNA target specified by the guide RNA. That same year, research showed that CRISPR Cas9 components could be programmed for site-specific double stranded DNA breaks in vitro, laying the foundation for genome editing.

By manipulating the nucleotide sequence of the guide RNA, the artificial Cas9 system could be programmed to target and cleave DNA sequence for separation. Around the same time, a collaboration including Virginijus Šikšnys, Gasiūnas, Barrangou, and Horvath showed that Cas9 from the S. thermophilus CRISPR system can also be reprogrammed by modifying its crRNA sequence to target specific DNA sites.

In 2013, research groups led by Feng Zhang and George Church reported successful targeted DNA editing in human genomes, marking the first use of CRISPR-Cas9 for targeted modification in eukaryotic systems. These findings advanced the development of CRISPR-Cas9 as a versatile genome editing tool across a wide range of organisms.

Beyond DNA cleavage, CRISPR Cas9 has been modified to function as programmable transcription factors that allow activation or silencing of targeted genes. The significance of the system's development was formally recognized in 2020, when Emmanuelle Charpentier and Jennifer Doudna were awarded a Nobel Prize in Chemistry for their work in CRISPR Cas9 genome editing.

== Mechanism ==
Native Cas9 is a 160-kilodalton endonuclease that requires a guide RNA composed of two distinct RNA molecules: CRISPR RNA (crRNA) and trans-activating crRNA (tracrRNA).

== Research ==
=== 2013 ===
In 2013, Mali, et al. and Gilbert, et al. reported that non-cleaving Cas9 variants can control transcriptional activators or repressors at specific DNA sequences. In the same year, Bikard, et al. reported that dCas9 can block RNA polymerase at promoters or during elongation, silencing genes.

=== 2014 ===
In 2014, Esvelt, Smidler, Catteruccia, and Church suggested that Cas9-based gene drives could spread genetic modifications through entire organism populations.

=== 2017-19 ===
In 2017, Li, et al. reported that Cas9 can target the end of the Hepatitis B viral genome ends, reducing infection.

Jensen et al., reported that dCas9 alters chromatin structure when fused to chromatin remodelers, . O'Geen, et al., reported that dCas9 with FOG1 represses genes by methylating H3K27.

Lowder, et al., reported that dCas9 represses plant genes like AtCSTF64 when fused to repressor domains.

In 2018, Lee, et al., reported that engineered Cas9 reduces off-target effects by altering reaction rates.

In 2019, Chen and Page-McCaw reported that Cas9 suppresses HIV-1 long terminal repeats, mutating the viral genome.

=== 2020 ===
In 2020, Uddin, Rudin, and Sen reported that Cas9 variants, such as Cas9 nickase, improve genome editing by reducing off-target effects.

=== 2025 ===
In 2025, Zhou, Diao, Li, and colleagues reported that apoNmeCas9 (an RNA-free form of NmeCas9) can stimulate Cas1–Cas2-mediated CRISPR spacer acquisition in a type II-C system when CRISPR RNA levels are low.

== CRISPR-mediated immunity ==
CRISPR systems in bacteria and archaea function as programmable restriction enzymes to combat viruses and plasmids. CRISPR loci consist of short, palindromic repeats and variable spacers (24–48 nucleotides) that store sequences from foreign DNA. Adjacent cas genes, including universal cas1 and cas2, and type II-specific cas9, encode proteins for immunity. Cas9 uses crRNA and tracrRNA to form a complex that targets and cleaves foreign DNA matching the spacer sequence.

=== Adaptation ===
During the adaptation stage, CRISPR systems integrate spacers from viral"protospacers" into the CRISPR locus. It requiring the presence of a PAM, such as NGG in S.pyogenes) for recognition. Cas9 ensures functional spacer acquisition. However, spacers can be lost via homologous recombination.

ApoCas9 has been reported to stimulate spacer acquisition in type II-C systems and to couple acquisition activity to CRISPR RNA abundance with low crRNA (e.g.: in cells undergoing array neogenesis or natural array contraction) associated with increased acquisition and higher crRNA (expanded arrays) associated with reduced acquisition. The nuclease lobe alone is sufficient to stimulate acquisition, whereas crRNA-dependent regulation required full-length Cas9. This activity is evolutionarily conserved across several type II-C Cas9 orthologues.

=== CRISPR processing ===
RNA polymerase transcribes the CRISPR locus into pre-crRNA, which is processed by specific endoribonucleases into mature crRNAs, each containing one spacer and a partial repeat.

=== Interference ===
In the interference stage, the crRNA guides Cas9 together with tracrRNA to complementary foreign DNA sequences. If the target sequence matches the spacer and a PAM is present, Cas9 introduces double-stranded breaks in DNA, stopping viral replication.

=== Transcription regulation ===
Inactive Cas9 (dCas9), lacking endonuclease activity, can bind DNA and regulate transcription. In eukaryotic cells, dCas9 targets enhancer sequences to prevent transcription factor binding and gene expression. Genome-wide screens using dCas9-based repression have been conducted to systematically identify gene funciton. In addition to DNA targeting leading to repression, active Cas9 has been shown to cleave mRNA when hybridized with complementary single-stranded containing a PAM complement.

== Structural studies ==
Cas9 has a bi-lobed structure with an alpha-helical lobe (REC) and a nuclease lobe (NUC) containing HNH and RuvC domains, connected by a bridge helix. The nuclease lobe contains HNH domains which cleaves target DNA strands, and RuvC which cleaves the non-target strand. The PAM-interacting domain recognizes the NGG PAM sequence. The single-guide RNA (sgRNA), replaces the crRNA-tracrRNA complex, and forms a T-shaped structure with the target DNA. A 2014 study reported that REC1 and bridge helix domains are critical for sgRNA recognition.

== Challenges in bacterial editing ==
Bacterial restriction-modification systems can degrade foreign DNA introduced into the cell. These systems recognize specific DNA sequences and cleave foreign DNA, including Cas9-introduced genes, hindering genome editing.

== Applications ==
=== Gene editing ===
Cas9 edits genomes in a range of species, including yeast (Saccharomyces cerevisiae), Candida albicans, zebrafish (Danio rerio), fruit flies (Drosophila melanogaster), ants (Harpegnathos saltator and Ooceraea biroi), mosquitoes (Aedes aegypti), nematodes (Caenorhabditis elegans), plants, mice (Mus musculus domesticus), and monkeys.

=== Cellular defense ===
CRISPR/Cas9 can help with bacterial defense against invaders such as bacteriophages, plasmids, and DNA viruses. Cas9, guided by RNA, acts as an endonuclease enzyme, targeting and cleaving foreign DNA. It unwinds foreign DNA and cleaves matching sites, similar to the RNA interference mechanism in eukaryotes.

=== Gene regulation ===
Other versions of Cas9 can bind but not cleave DNA. They can be used to control transcriptional activator or repressor genes and manage gene activation and repression.

More technically, Cas9 is a RNA-guided DNA endonuclease enzyme associated with the Clustered Regularly Interspaced Short Palindromic Repeats (CRISPR) adaptive immune system in Streptococcus pyogenes. S. pyogenes utilizes CRISPR to memorize and Cas9 to later interrogate and cleave foreign DNA, such as invading bacteriophage DNA or plasmid DNA. Cas9 performs this interrogation by unwinding foreign DNA and checking for sites complementary to the 20 nucleotide spacer region of the guide RNA (gRNA). If the DNA substrate is complementary to the guide RNA, Cas9 cleaves the invading DNA. In this sense, the CRISPR-Cas9 mechanism parallels the RNA interference (RNAi) mechanism in eukaryotes. Apart from its original function in bacterial immunity, Cas9 has been utilized as a genome engineering tool to induce site-directed double-strand breaks in DNA. These breaks can lead to gene inactivation or the introduction of heterologous genes through non-homologous end joining and homologous recombination respectively in model organisms. Research on cas9 variants has been a promising way of overcoming the limitation of the CRISPR-Cas9 genome editing. Examples include Cas9 nickase (Cas9n), a variant that induces single-stranded breaks (SSBs) or variants recognizing different PAM sequences. Alongside zinc finger nucleases and transcription activator-like effector nuclease (TALEN) proteins, Cas9 is becoming a prominent tool in the field of genome editing.

Cas9 has gained traction in recent years because it can cleave nearly any sequence complementary to the guide RNA. Because the target specificity of Cas9 stems from the guide RNA:DNA complementarity and not modifications to the protein itself (like TALENs and zinc fingers), engineering Cas9 to target new DNA is straightforward. Cas9 targeting has been simplified through the engineering of a chimeric single guide RNA (chiRNA). Scientists have suggested that Cas9-based gene drives may be capable of editing the genomes of entire populations of organisms. In 2015, Cas9 was used to modify the genome of human embryos for the first time.

== CRISPR-mediated immunity ==
To survive in a variety of challenging, inhospitable habitats that are filled with bacteriophages, bacteria and archaea have evolved methods to evade and fend off predatory viruses. This includes the CRISPR system of adaptive immunity. In practice, CRISPR/Cas systems act as self-programmable restriction enzymes. CRISPR loci are composed of short, palindromic repeats that occur at regular intervals composed of alternate CRISPR repeats and variable CRISPR spacers between 24 and 48 nucleotides long. These CRISPR loci are usually accompanied by adjacent CRISPR-associated (cas) genes. In 2005, it was discovered by three separate groups that the spacer regions were homologous to foreign DNA elements, including plasmids and viruses. These reports provided the first biological evidence that CRISPRs might function as an immune system.

Cas9 has been used often as a genome-editing tool. Cas9 has been used in recent developments in preventing viruses from manipulating hosts' DNA. Since the CRISPR-Cas9 was developed from bacterial genome systems, it can be used to target the genetic material in viruses. The use of the enzyme Cas9 can be a solution to many viral infections. Cas9 possesses the ability to target specific viruses by the targeting of specific strands of the viral genetic information. More specifically the Cas9 enzyme targets certain sections of the viral genome that prevents the virus from carrying out its normal function. Cas9 has also been used to disrupt the detrimental strand of DNA and RNA that cause diseases and mutated strands of DNA. Cas9 has already showed promise in disrupting the effects of HIV-1. Cas9 has been shown to suppress the expression of the long terminal repeats in HIV-1. When introduced into the HIV-1 genome Cas9 has shown the ability to mutate strands of HIV-1. Cas9 has also been used in the treatment of Hepatitis B through targeting of the ends of certain of long terminal repeats in the Hepatitis B viral genome. Cas9 has been used to repair the mutations causing cataracts in mice.

Fig. 2: The Stages of CRISPR immunity

CRISPR-Cas systems are divided into three major types (type I, type II, and type III) and twelve subtypes, which are based on their genetic content and structural differences. However, the core defining features of all CRISPR-Cas systems are the cas genes and their proteins: cas1 and cas2 are universal across types and subtypes, while cas3, cas9, and cas10 are signature genes for type I, type II, and type III, respectively.

=== CRISPR-Cas defense stages ===
==== Adaptation ====
Adaptation involves recognition and integration of spacers between two adjacent repeats in the CRISPR locus. The "Protospacer" refers to the sequence on the viral genome that corresponds to the spacer. A short stretch of conserved nucleotides exists proximal to the protospacer, which is called the protospacer adjacent motif (PAM). The PAM is a recognition motif that is used to acquire the DNA fragment. In type II, Cas9 recognizes the PAM during adaptation in order to ensure the acquisition of functional spacers.

Loss of spacers and even groups of several have also been observed by Aranaz et al. 2004 and Pourcel et al. 2007. This probably occurs through homologous recombination of the between-repeat material.

==== CRISPR processing/biogenesis ====
CRISPR expression includes the transcription of a primary transcript called a CRISPR RNA (pre-crRNA), which is transcribed from the CRISPR locus by RNA polymerase. Specific endoribonucleases then cleave the pre-crRNAs into small CRISPR RNAs (crRNAs).

==== Interference/immunity ====
Interference involves the crRNAs within a multi-protein complex called CASCADE, which can recognize and specifically base-pair with regions of inserting complementary foreign DNA. The crRNA-foreign nucleic acid complex is then cleaved, however if there are mismatches between the spacer and the target DNA, or if there are mutations in the PAM, then cleavage will not be initiated. In the latter scenario, the foreign DNA is not targeted for attack by the cell, thus the replication of the virus proceeds and the host is not immune to viral infection. The interference stage can be mechanistically and temporally distinct from CRISPR acquisition and expression, yet for complete function as a defense system, all three phases must be functional.

Stage 1: CRISPR spacer integration. Protospacers and protospacer-associated motifs (shown in red) are acquired at the "leader" end of a CRISPR array in the host DNA. The CRISPR array is composed of spacer sequences (shown in colored boxes) flanked by repeats (black diamonds). This process requires Cas1 and Cas2 (and Cas9 in type II), which are encoded in the cas locus, which are usually located near the CRISPR array.

Stage 2: CRISPR expression. Pre-crRNA is transcribed starting at the leader region by the host RNA polymerase and then cleaved by Cas proteins into smaller crRNAs containing a single spacer and a partial repeat (shown as hairpin structure with colored spacers).

Stage 3: CRISPR interference. crRNA with a spacer that has strong complementarity to the incoming foreign DNA begins a cleavage event (depicted with scissors), which requires Cas proteins. DNA cleavage interferes with viral replication and provides immunity to the host. The interference stage can be functionally and temporarily distinct from CRISPR acquisition and expression (depicted by white line dividing the cell).

=== Transcription deactivation using dCas9 ===
dCas9, also referred to as endonuclease deficient Cas9 can be utilized to edit gene expression when applied to the transcription binding site of the desired section of a gene. The optimal function of dCas9 is attributed to its mode of action. Gene expression is inhibited when nucleotides are no longer added to the RNA chain and therefore terminating elongation of that chain, and as a result affects the transcription process. This process occurs when dCas9 is mass-produced so it is able to affect the most genes at any given time via a sequence specific guide RNA molecule. Since dCas9 appears to down regulate gene expression, this action is amplified even more when it is used in conjunction with repressive chromatin modifier domains. The dCas9 protein has other functions outside of the regulation of gene expression. A promoter can be added to the dCas9 protein which allows them to work with each other to become efficient at beginning or stopping transcription at different sequences along a strand of DNA. These two proteins are specific in where they act on a gene. This is prevalent in certain types of prokaryotes when a promoter and dCas9 align themselves together to impede the ability of elongation of polymer of nucleotides coming together to form a transcribed piece of DNA. Without the promoter, the dCas9 protein does not have the same effect by itself or with a gene body.

When examining the effects of repression of transcription further, H3K27, an amino acid component of a histone, becomes methylated through the interaction of dCas9 and a peptide called FOG1. Essentially, this interaction causes gene repression on the C + N terminal section of the amino acid complex at the specific junction of the gene, and as a result, terminates transcription.

dCas9 also proves to be efficient when it comes to altering certain proteins that can create diseases. When the dCas9 attaches to a form of RNA called guide-RNA, it prevents the proliferation of repeating codons and DNA sequences that might be harmful to an organism's genome. Essentially, when multiple repeat codons are produced, it elicits a response, or recruits an abundance of dCas9 to combat the overproduction of those codons and results in the shut-down of transcription. dCas9 works synergistically with gRNA and directly affects the DNA polymerase II from continuing transcription.

Further explanation of how the dCas9 protein works can be found in their utilization of plant genomes by the regulation of gene production in plants to either increase or decrease certain characteristics. The CRISPR-CAS9 system has the ability to either upregulate or downregulate genes. The dCas9 proteins are a component of the CRISPR-CAS9 system and these proteins can repress certain areas of a plant gene. This happens when dCAS9 binds to repressor domains, and in the case of the plants, deactivation of a regulatory gene such as AtCSTF64, does occur.

Bacteria are another focus of the usage of dCas9 proteins as well. Since eukaryotes have a larger DNA makeup and genome; the much smaller bacteria are easy to manipulate. As a result, eukaryotes use dCas9 to inhibit RNA polymerase from continuing the process of transcription of genetic material.

== Structural and biochemical studies ==
=== Crystal structure ===
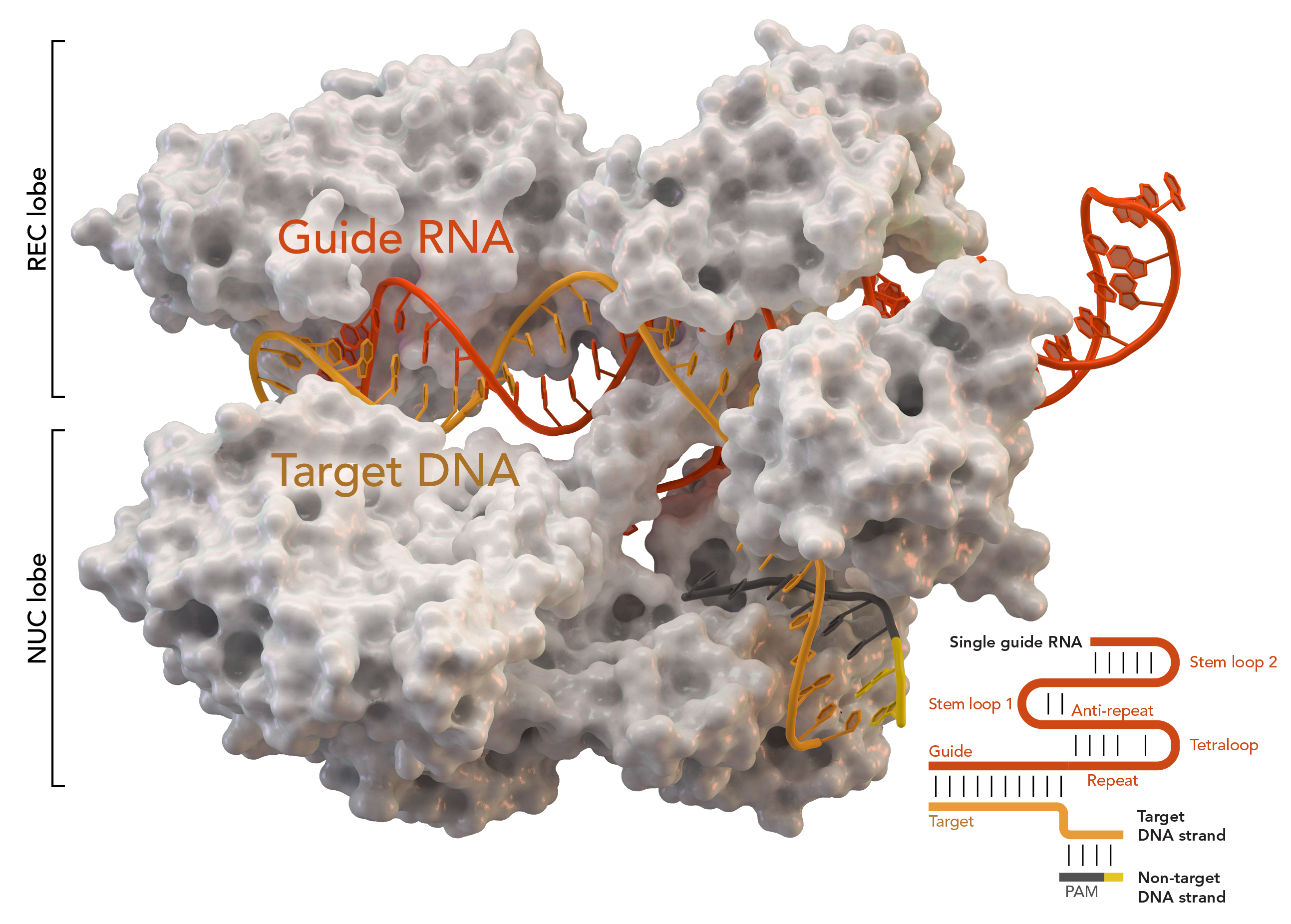
Crystal structure of CRISPR-associated protein Cas9, based on PDB 5AXW by Nishimasu et al.

Cas9 features a bi-lobed architecture with the guide RNA nestled between the alpha-helical lobe (blue) and the nuclease lobe (cyan, orange, and gray). These two lobes are connected through a single bridge helix. There are two nuclease domains located in the multi-domain nuclease lobe, the RuvC (gray) which cleaves the non-target DNA strand, and the HNH nuclease domain (cyan) that cleaves the target strand of DNA. The RuvC domain is encoded by sequentially disparate sites that interact in the tertiary structure to form the RuvC cleavage domain (See right figure).

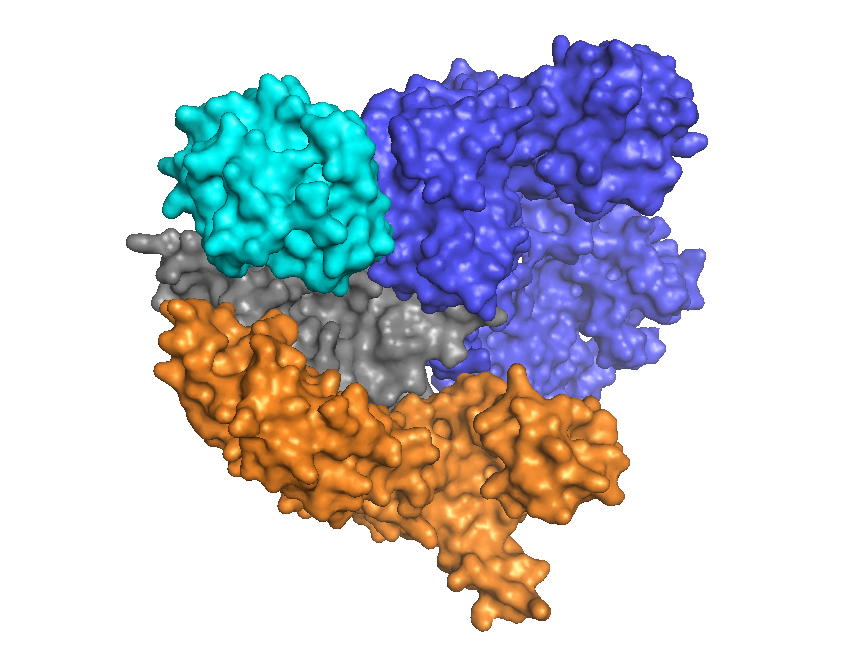
Crystal structure of Cas9 in the Apo form. Structural rendition was performed using UCSF Chimera software.

A key feature of the target DNA is that it must contain a protospacer adjacent motif (PAM) consisting of the three-nucleotide sequence- NGG. This PAM is recognized by the PAM-interacting domain (PI domain, orange) located near the C-terminal end of Cas9. Cas9 undergoes distinct conformational changes between the apo (apoenzyme), guide RNA bound, and guide RNA:DNA bound states.

Cas9 recognizes the stem-loop architecture inherent in the CRISPR locus, which mediates the maturation of crRNA-tracrRNA ribonucleoprotein complex. Cas9 in complex with CRISPR RNA (crRNA) and trans-activating crRNA (tracrRNA) further recognizes and degrades the target dsDNA. In the co-crystal structure shown here, the crRNA-tracrRNA complex is replaced by a chimeric single-guide RNA (sgRNA, in red) which has been proved to have the same function as the natural RNA complex. The sgRNA base paired with target ssDNA is anchored by Cas9 as a T-shaped architecture. This crystal structure of the DNA-bound Cas9 enzyme reveals distinct conformational changes in the alpha-helical lobe with respect to the nuclease lobe, as well as the location of the HNH domain. The protein consists of a recognition lobe (REC) and a nuclease lobe (NUC). All regions except the HNH form tight interactions with each other and sgRNA-ssDNA complex, while the HNH domain forms few contacts with the rest of the protein. In another conformation of Cas9 complex observed in the crystal, the HNH domain is not visible. These structures suggest the conformational flexibility of HNH domain.

To date, at least three crystal structures have been studied and published. One representing a conformation of Cas9 in the apo state, and two representing Cas9 in the DNA bound state.

=== Interactions with sgRNA ===
CRISPR/Cas9

In sgRNA-Cas9 complex, based on the crystal structure, REC1, BH and PI domains have important contacts with backbone or bases in both repeat and spacer region. Several Cas9 mutants including REC1 or REC2 domains deletion and residues mutations in BH have been tested. REC1 and BH related mutants show lower or none activity compared with wild type, which indicate these two domains are crucial for the sgRNA recognition at repeat sequence and stabilization of the whole complex. Although the interactions between spacer sequence and Cas9 as well as PI domain and repeat region need further studies, the co-crystal demonstrates clear interface between Cas9 and sgRNA.

=== DNA cleavage ===
Cas9 contains two nuclease domains an McrA-like HNH nuclease domain and a RuvC-like nuclease domain. These HNH domain cleaves the complementary (target) DNA strand, while the RuvC-like nuclease domains are responsible for cleavage of the non-complementary (non-target DNA strands). Despite low sequence similarity, the region homologous to RNase H adopts a RuvC fold and the HNH region folds similarly to T4 Endo VII, a member of the HNH endonuclease family.

Wild-type Streptococcus pyogenes Cas9 requires magnesium (Mg^{2+}) cofactors for RNA-mediated DNA cleavage, although varying levels of activity has been observed in the presence of other divalent metal ions. For example, in the presence of manganese (Mn^{2+}), Cas9 has been shown to be exhibit RNA-independent DNA cleavage.

Cas9 nuclease and its DNA cleavage position

DNA cleavage requires the presence of a protospacer adjacent motif (PAM) located at the non-target strand three nucleotides downstream from the cleavage site. The canonical PAM sequence for S. Pyogenes Cas9 is NGG, but alternative motifs like NAG and NGA are tolerated with lower cleavage activity. While the cleavage of DNA by RNA-bound Cas9 is

A diagram of the CRISPR nucleases Cas12a and Cas9 with the position of DNA cleavage shown relative to their PAM sequences in a zoom-in

relatively rapid (k ≥ 700 s^{−1}), the release of the cleavage products is very slow (t_{1/2} = ln(2)/k ≈ 43–91 h), essentially rendering Cas9 a single-turnover enzyme. Additional studies regarding the kinetics of Cas9 have shown engineered Cas9 to be effective in reducing off-target effects by modifying the rate of the reaction.

Cleavage efficiency depends on several factors, including PAM recognition, nucleotide composition of the 20 nucleotide spacer-complementary region of the gRNAm. The most relevant nucleotide composition properties that impact efficiency are those in the PAM-proximal region. Free energy changes of nucleic acids are also highly relevant in defining cleavage activity. Guide RNAs that bind to the DNA forming a duplex that falls into a restricted range of binding free energy changes that excludes extremely weak or stable bindings generally perform efficiently. Stable guide RNA folding conformations can also impair cleavage.

DNA cleavage patterns

The seminal structural characterization of the nuclease demonstrated that the HNH domain precisely cleaves between the positions 18 and 17 (18|17) of the protospacer, while the RuvC cleaves the non-target strand at corresponding and downstream positions. Molecular dynamics simulations reported that cleavage of the NTS between 17|16 of the target sequence was more energetically favored than 18|17, generating 1 nucleotide 5' ssDNA overhangs. Notably, the authors demonstrated that the 5' overhangs are filled in during DNA repair, resulting in templated insertions, where the 5' overhang is used as a template by Pol4 for the repair reaction. The association between staggered cleavage and precise templated insertions have been supported by additional studies in human cells.

The nucleotide composition of the five bases closest to the PAM in the target sequence also affects the scission profile, influencing whether DNA cleavage is blunt or staggered. In 2024 a high-throughput investigation of Cas9 scission profile revealed that ~85% of on-target cleavage is blunt, whereas ~15% had a 1 nucleotide 5' overhang. Off-targets had a higher staggered cleavage rate compared to on-target sites, with approximately 1/3 of off-targets displaying 5' overhangs from 1 to 3 nucleotides. Sequence patterns within the target region were shown to favor the formation of either blunt or staggered DNA cuts, and staggered cleavage was associated with the formation of predictable insertion-deletion (indel) outcomes.

=== Problems bacteria pose to Cas9 editing ===
Most archaea and bacteria stubbornly refuse to allow a Cas9 to edit their genome. This is because they can attach foreign DNA, that does not affect them, into their genome. Another way that these cells defy Cas9 is by process of restriction modification (RM) system. When a bacteriophage enters a bacteria or archaea cell it is targeted by the RM system. The RM system then cuts the bacteriophages DNA into separate pieces by restriction enzymes and uses endonucleases to further destroy the strands of DNA. This poses a problem to Cas9 editing because the RM system also targets the foreign genes added by the Cas9 process.

== Applications of Cas9 to transcription tuning ==
=== Interference of transcription by dCas9 ===
Due to the unique ability of Cas9 to bind to essentially any complement sequence in any genome, researchers wanted to use this enzyme to repress transcription of various genomic loci. To accomplish this, the two crucial catalytic residues of the RuvC and HNH domain can be mutated to alanine abolishing all endonuclease activity of Cas9. The resulting protein coined 'dead' Cas9 or 'dCas9' for short, can still tightly bind to dsDNA. This catalytically inactive Cas9 variant has been used for both mechanistic studies into Cas9 DNA interrogative binding and as a general programmable DNA binding RNA-Protein complex.

The interaction of dCas9 with target dsDNA is so tight that high molarity urea protein denaturant can not fully dissociate the dCas9 RNA-protein complex from dsDNA target. dCas9 has been targeted with engineered single guide RNAs to transcription initiation sites of any loci where dCas9 can compete with RNA polymerase at promoters to halt transcription. Also, dCas9 can be targeted to the coding region of loci such that inhibition of RNA Polymerase occurs during the elongation phase of transcription. In Eukaryotes, silencing of gene expression can be extended by targeting dCas9 to enhancer sequences, where dCas9 can block assembly of transcription factors leading to silencing of specific gene expression. Moreover, the guide RNAs provided to dCas9 can be designed to include specific mismatches to its complementary cognate sequence that will quantitatively weaken the interaction of dCas9 for its programmed cognate sequence allowing a researcher to tune the extent of gene silencing applied to a gene of interest. This technology is similar in principle to RNAi such that gene expression is being modulated at the RNA level. However, the dCas9 approach has gained much traction as there exist less off-target effects and in general larger and more reproducible silencing effects through the use of dCas9 compared to RNAi screens. Furthermore, because the dCas9 approach to gene silencing can be quantitatively controlled, a researcher can now precisely control the extent to which a gene of interest is repressed allowing more questions about gene regulation and gene stoichiometry to be answered.

Beyond direct binding of dCas9 to transcriptionally sensitive positions of loci, dCas9 can be fused to a variety of modulatory protein domains to carry out a myriad of functions. Recently, dCas9 has been fused to chromatin remodeling proteins (HDACs/HATs) to reorganize the chromatin structure around various loci. This is important in targeting various eukaryotic genes of interest as heterochromatin structures hinder Cas9 binding. Furthermore, because Cas9 can react to heterochromatin, it is theorized that this enzyme can be further applied to studying the chromatin structure of various loci. Additionally, dCas9 has been employed in genome wide screens of gene repression. By employing large libraries of guide RNAs capable of targeting thousands of genes, genome wide genetic screens using dCas9 have been conducted.

Another method for silencing transcription with Cas9 is to directly cleave mRNA products with the catalytically active Cas9 enzyme. This approach is made possible by hybridizing ssDNA with a PAM complement sequence to ssRNA allowing for a dsDNA-RNA PAM site for Cas9 binding. This technology makes available the ability to isolate endogenous RNA transcripts in cells without the need to induce chemical modifications to RNA or RNA tagging methods.

=== Transcription activation and repression by dCas9 fusion proteins ===
In contrast to silencing genes, dCas9 can also be used to activate genes when fused to exogenous transcription activating factors. These factors include subunits of bacterial RNA Polymerase II and traditional transcription factors in eukaryotes. Recently, genome-wide screens of transcription activation have also been accomplished using dCas9 fusions named "CRISPRa" (for activation). Exogenous transcription repressors can also be used to increase the repressive function of dCas9.

=== Transcription activation and repression by induced proximity ===
Activation or repression of genes using dCas9 can also be done by recruiting or degrading, respectively, a cell's own endogenous transcription activators; this requires strategies that incorporate specially designed small molecules and fusion proteins alongside dCas9.

== See also ==
- DCas9 activation system
- CRISPR
- CRISPR gene editing
- Genome editing
- Zinc finger nuclease
- Transcription activator-like effector nuclease
