= Thermobiology =

Study of the effects of temperature on biology

Thermobiology is the scientific study of how temperature impacts biology and how organisms have adapted to the temperature of their environments. Examples include the natural selection for adaptations such as thermoregulation in macro-organisms including fur growth in mammals and seasonal shedding of leaves in deciduous plants, but also the reliance of thermophilic bacteria on heat-resistant DNA polymerase and the use of sub-zero cryopreservation of biological tissue in research and medicine. A major branch of thermobiology is the molecular mechanisms of those biological adaptions, such as those observed in selective activation of enzymes and variable membrane permeability.

== Thermoregulation in macro-organisms ==
Thermoregulation in organisms runs along a spectrum from endothermy to ectothermy. Endotherms create most of their heat via metabolic processes and are colloquially referred to as warm-blooded. When the surrounding temperatures are cold, endotherms increase metabolic heat production to keep their body temperature constant, thus making the internal body temperature of an endotherm more or less independent of the temperature of the environment. Endotherms possess a larger number of mitochondria per cell than ectotherms, enabling them to generate more heat by increasing the rate at which they metabolize fats and sugars. Ectotherms use external sources of temperature to regulate their body temperature. They are colloquially referred to as cold-blooded despite the fact that their body temperatures often stay within the same temperature ranges as warm-blooded animals. Ectotherms are the opposite of endotherms when it comes to regulating internal temperatures. In ectotherms, the internal physiological sources of heat are of negligible importance; the biggest factor that enables them to maintain adequate body temperatures is due to environmental influences. Living in areas that maintain a constant temperature throughout the year, like the tropics or the ocean, has enabled ectotherms to develop behavioral mechanisms that respond to external temperatures, such as sunbathing to increase body temperature or seeking the cover of shade to lower body temperature.

== Molecular mechanisms ==
=== Enzyme kinetics ===
Enzymes allow biochemical processes to occur in lower temperature ranges, and can become inactivated at higher temperatures.

=== Freezing point depression ===
==== Protein-mediated ====
In the 1950s, Norwegian scientist Scholander set out to explain how Arctic fish can survive in water colder than the freezing point of their blood. His experiments led him to believe there was "antifreeze" in the blood of Arctic fish. Then in the late 1960s, animal biologist Arthur DeVries was able to isolate the antifreeze protein through his investigation of Antarctic fish. These proteins were later called antifreeze glycoproteins (AFGPs) or antifreeze glycopeptides to distinguish them from newly discovered nonglycoprotein biological antifreeze agents (AFPs). DeVries worked with Robert Feeney (1970) to characterize the chemical and physical properties of antifreeze proteins. In 1992, Griffith et al. documented their discovery of AFP in winter rye leaves. Around the same time, Urrutia, Duman and Knight (1992) documented thermal hysteresis protein in angiosperms. The next year, Duman and Olsen noted AFPs had also been discovered in over 23 species of angiosperms, including ones eaten by humans. They reported their presence in fungi and bacteria as well.

==== Prevention of crystal formation ====
Tardigrades, microscopic animals sometimes known as water bears, can survive freezing by replacing most of their internal water with a sugar called trehalose, preventing it from crystallization that otherwise damages cell membranes. Mixtures of solutes can achieve similar effects. Some solutes, including salts, have the disadvantage that they may be toxic at intense concentrations. Wood frogs can also tolerate the freezing of their blood and other tissues. Urea is accumulated in tissues in preparation for overwintering, and liver glycogen is converted in large quantities to glucose in response to internal ice formation. Both urea and glucose act as "cryoprotectants" to limit the amount of ice that forms and to reduce osmotic shrinkage of cells. Frogs can survive many freeze/thaw events during winter if no more than about 65% of the total body water freezes. Research exploring the phenomenon of "freezing frogs" has been performed primarily by the Canadian researcher, Dr. Kenneth B. Storey.

Freeze tolerance, in which organisms survive the winter by freezing solid and ceasing life functions, is known in a few vertebrates: five species of frogs (Rana sylvatica, Pseudacris triseriata, Hyla crucifer, Hyla versicolor, Hyla chrysoscelis), one of salamanders (Salamandrella keyserlingii), one of snakes (Thamnophis sirtalis) and three of turtles (Chrysemys picta, Terrapene carolina, Terrapene ornata). Snapping turtles Chelydra serpentina and wall lizards Podarcis muralis also survive nominal freezing but it has not been established to be adaptive for overwintering. In the case of Rana sylvatica one cryopreservant is ordinary glucose, which increases in concentration by approximately 19 mmol/L when the frogs are cooled slowly.

=== RNA Thermometers ===
A stable hairpin (left) unwinds at a higher temperature (right). The highlighted Shine-Dalgarno sequence becomes exposed, allowing the binding of the 30S ribosomal subunit.

RNA thermometers are found in the 5′ UTR of messenger RNA, upstream of a protein-coding gene. Here they are able to occlude the ribosome binding site (RBS) and prevent translation of the mRNA into protein. As temperature increases, the hairpin structure can 'melt' and expose the RBS or Shine-Dalgarno sequence to permit binding of the small ribosomal subunit (30S), which then assembles other translation machinery. The start codon, typically found 8 nucleotides downstream of the Shine-Dalgarno sequence, signals the beginning of a protein-coding gene which is then translated to a peptide product by the ribosome. In addition to this cis-acting mechanism, a lone example of a trans-acting RNA thermometer has been found in RpoS mRNA where it is thought to be involved in the starvation response.

A specific example of an RNA thermometer motif is the FourU thermometer found in Salmonella enterica. When exposed to temperatures above 45 °C, the stem-loop that base-pairs opposite the Shine-Dalgarno sequence becomes unpaired and allows the mRNA to enter the ribosome for translation to occur. Mg^{2+} ion concentration has also been shown to affect the stability of FourU. The most well-studied RNA thermometer is found in the rpoH gene in Escherichia coli. This thermosensor upregulates heat shock proteins under high temperatures through σ^{32}, a specialised heat-shock sigma factor.

Though typically associated with heat-induced protein expression, RNA thermometers can also regulate cold-shock proteins. For example, the expression of two 7kDa proteins are regulated by an RNA thermometer in the thermophilic bacterium Thermus thermophilus and a similar mechanism has been identified in Enterobacteriales.

RNA thermometers sensitive to temperatures of 37 °C can be used by pathogens to activate infection-specific genes. For example, the upregulation of prfA, encoding a key transcriptional regulator of virulence genes in Listeria monocytogenes, was demonstrated by fusing the 5′ DNA of prfA to the green fluorescent protein gene; the gene fusion was then transcribed from the T7 promoter in E. coli, and fluorescence was observed at 37 °C but not at 30 °C.

=== Membrane porosity ===
A fundamental biophysical determinant of membrane fluidity is the balance between saturated and unsaturated fatty acids. Regulating membrane fluidity is especially important in poikilothermic organisms such as bacteria, fungi, protists, plants, fish and other ectothermic animals. The general trend is an increase in unsaturated fatty acids at lower growth temperatures and an increase in saturated fatty acids at higher temperatures.

=== Mutations ===
Temperature-sensitive mutations can significantly impact an organism's development by altering gene function at specific temperatures. These mutations affect proteins that may function normally at a lower, "permissive" temperature but become dysfunctional or degrade at a higher, "restrictive" temperature. This characteristic allows researchers to study gene function by controlling temperature conditions.

One example is a mutation in the virilizer (vir) gene in Drosophila melanogaster, which prevents the proper development of female traits at elevated temperatures. This demonstrates the crucial role temperature-sensitive mutations play in regulating developmental pathways.

Temperature-sensitive mutations have also been observed in human diseases. For instance, in spinal muscular atrophy (SMA), mutations affecting the Survival of Motor Neuron (SMN) protein can render it unstable at higher temperatures, leading to impaired nerve function.

Researchers have developed methods to introduce temperature-sensitive mutations artificially. One approach utilizes intein-mediated protein splicing, where protein segments remove themselves under specific temperature conditions. A study by Tan et al. (2009) demonstrated how engineered inteins can regulate protein function by allowing the intein to splice at lower temperatures while remaining intact at higher temperatures, thereby disrupting protein activity.

By leveraging temperature-sensitive mutations, scientists can study the functional roles of genes and proteins in both normal development and disease processes.

== Artificial applications ==
=== Food preservation ===
Mankind has long taken advantage of the natural thermobiological properties of bacterial and mold in food preservation. Techniques that have existed for hundreds of years or even thousands of years, long before humans understood the underlying mechanisms, include boiling, bog butter, canning, confit, cooling, curing, drying, fermentation, freezing, heating, jellying, jugging, kangina, lye, pickling, and sugaring. More modern techniques include aseptic processing, pasteurization, vacuum packing, freeze drying, preservatives, irradiation, electroporation, modified atmosphere, nonthermal plasma, high-pressure food preservation, and biopreservation.

=== Research ===
==== Cryopreservation ====
A cryoprotectant is a substance used to protect biological tissue from freezing damage (i.e. that due to ice formation). Arctic and Antarctic insects, fish and amphibians create cryoprotectants (antifreeze compounds and antifreeze proteins) in their bodies to minimize freezing damage during cold winter periods. Cryoprotectants are also used to preserve living materials in the study of biology and to preserve food products.

For years, glycerol has been used in cryobiology as a cryoprotectant for blood cells and bull sperm, allowing storage in liquid nitrogen at temperatures around −196 °C. However, glycerol cannot be used to protect whole organs from damage. Instead, many biotechnology companies are researching the development of other cryoprotectants more suitable for such uses. A successful discovery may eventually make possible the bulk cryogenic storage (or "banking") of transplantable human and xenobiotic organs. A substantial step in that direction has already occurred. Twenty-First Century Medicine has vitrified a rabbit kidney to −135 °C with their proprietary vitrification cocktail. Upon rewarming, the kidney was successfully transplanted into a rabbit, with complete functionality and viability, able to sustain the rabbit indefinitely as the sole functioning kidney.

==== Polymerase-chain reactions ====
In the early 1980s, Kary Mullis was working at Cetus Corporation on the application of synthetic DNAs to biotechnology. He was familiar with the use of DNA oligonucleotides as probes for binding to target DNA strands, as well as their use as primers for DNA sequencing and cDNA synthesis. In 1983, he began using two primers, one to hybridize to each strand of a target DNA, and adding DNA polymerase to the reaction. This led to exponential DNA replication, greatly amplifying discrete segments of DNA between the primers.

However, after each round of replication the mixture needs to be heated above 90 °C to denature the newly formed DNA, allowing the strands to separate and act as templates in the next round of amplification. This heating step also inactivates the DNA polymerase that was in use before the discovery of Taq polymerase, the Klenow fragment (sourced from E. coli). Taq polymerase is well-suited for this application because it is able to withstand the temperature of 95 °C which is required for DNA strand separation without denaturing.

Use of the thermostable Taq enables running the PCR at high temperature (~60 °C and above), which facilitates high specificity of the primers and reduces the production of nonspecific products, such as primer dimer. Also, use of a thermostable polymerase eliminates the need to add new enzyme to each round of thermocycling. A single closed tube in a relatively simple machine can be used to carry out the entire process. Thus, the use of Taq polymerase was the key idea that made PCR applicable to a large variety of molecular biology problems concerning DNA analysis.

=== Medicine ===
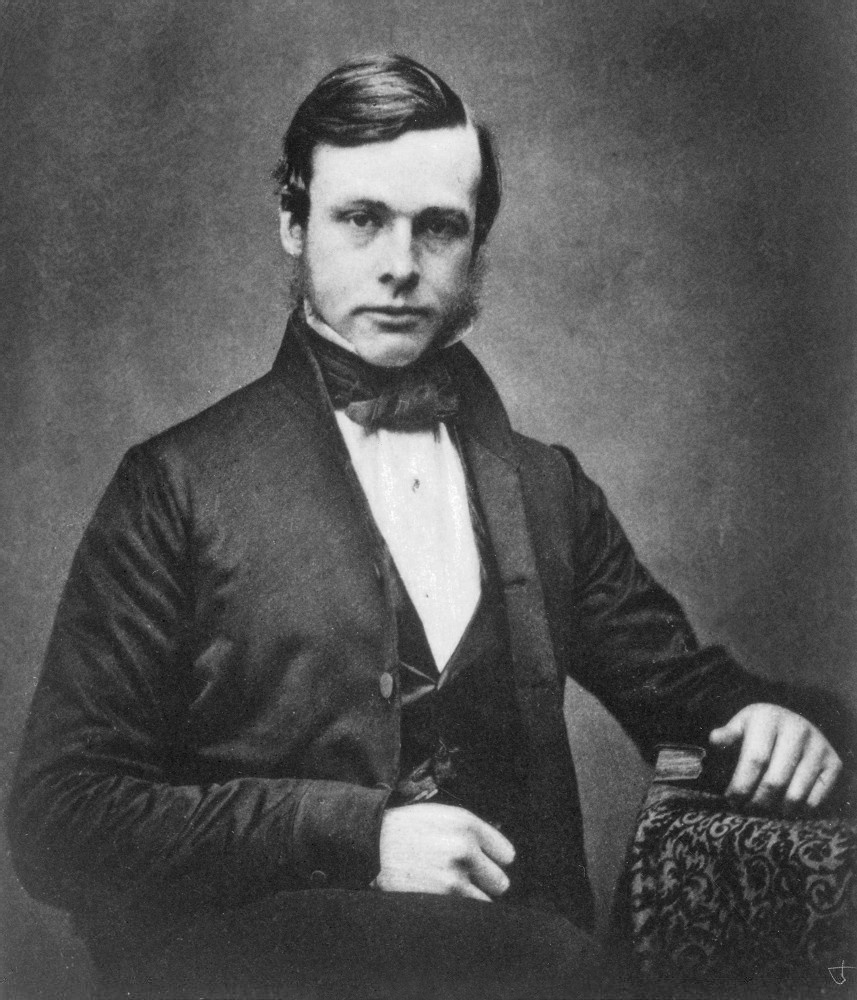
Joseph Lister, a pioneer of antiseptic surgery.

Apparatus to sterilize surgical instruments (1914–1918)

In general, surgical instruments and medications that enter an already aseptic part of the body (such as the bloodstream, or penetrating the skin) must be sterile. Examples of such instruments include scalpels, hypodermic needles, and artificial pacemakers. This is also essential in the manufacture of parenteral pharmaceuticals.

Preparation of injectable medications and intravenous solutions for fluid replacement therapy requires not only sterility but also well-designed containers to prevent entry of adventitious agents after initial product sterilization.

The sterilization of surgical instruments by boiling, dry heat, and flame treatment was introduced around 1883 by Octave Roche Simon Terrillon. The general introduction of steam sterilization into surgery occurred in 1886 by Ernst von Bergmann and Curt Schimmelbusch. In 1890 the use of an Arnold Steam Cooker for sterilization of medical instruments was published and demonstrated by Dr. Herbert E. Smith. Within a year modifications were made creating the Arnold Sterilizer as laboratories and physicians documented the success of steam sterilization. Most medical and surgical devices used in healthcare facilities are made of materials that are able to undergo steam sterilization. However, since 1950, there has been an increase in medical devices and instruments made of materials (e.g., plastics) that require low-temperature sterilization. Ethylene oxide gas has been used since the 1950s for heat- and moisture-sensitive medical devices. Within the past 15 years, a number of new, low-temperature sterilization systems (e.g., vaporized hydrogen peroxide, peracetic acid immersion, ozone) have been developed and are being used to sterilize medical devices.

== See also ==
- Thermoregulation
- Extremophiles
- Biochemistry
- Enzyme kinetics
- Freezing point depression
