= Hsp17 thermometer =

RNA element in cynobacteria

- Predicted secondary structure and sequence conservation of PinT small RNA

Identifiers
- Rfam: RF02358

Other data
- Domain(s): Bacteria
- GO: GO:0009266
- SO: SO:0005836
- PDB structures: PDBe

In molecular biology, the Hsp17 thermometer is an RNA element (RNA thermometer) found in the 5' UTR of Hsp17 mRNA. Hsp17 is a cyanobacterial heat shock protein belonging to the Hsp20 family.

At physiological temperature (28 degrees Celsius) the Hsp17 thermometer forms a hairpin structure, preventing translation of Hsp17. Under heat shock conditions the hairpin structure melts and translation takes place.

== See also ==
- RNA thermometer
- ROSE element
- FourU thermometer
- Hsp90 cis-regulatory element
- Cyanobacterial RNA thermometers
