= Cas12a =

DNA-editing technology

CRISPR-associated protein 12a
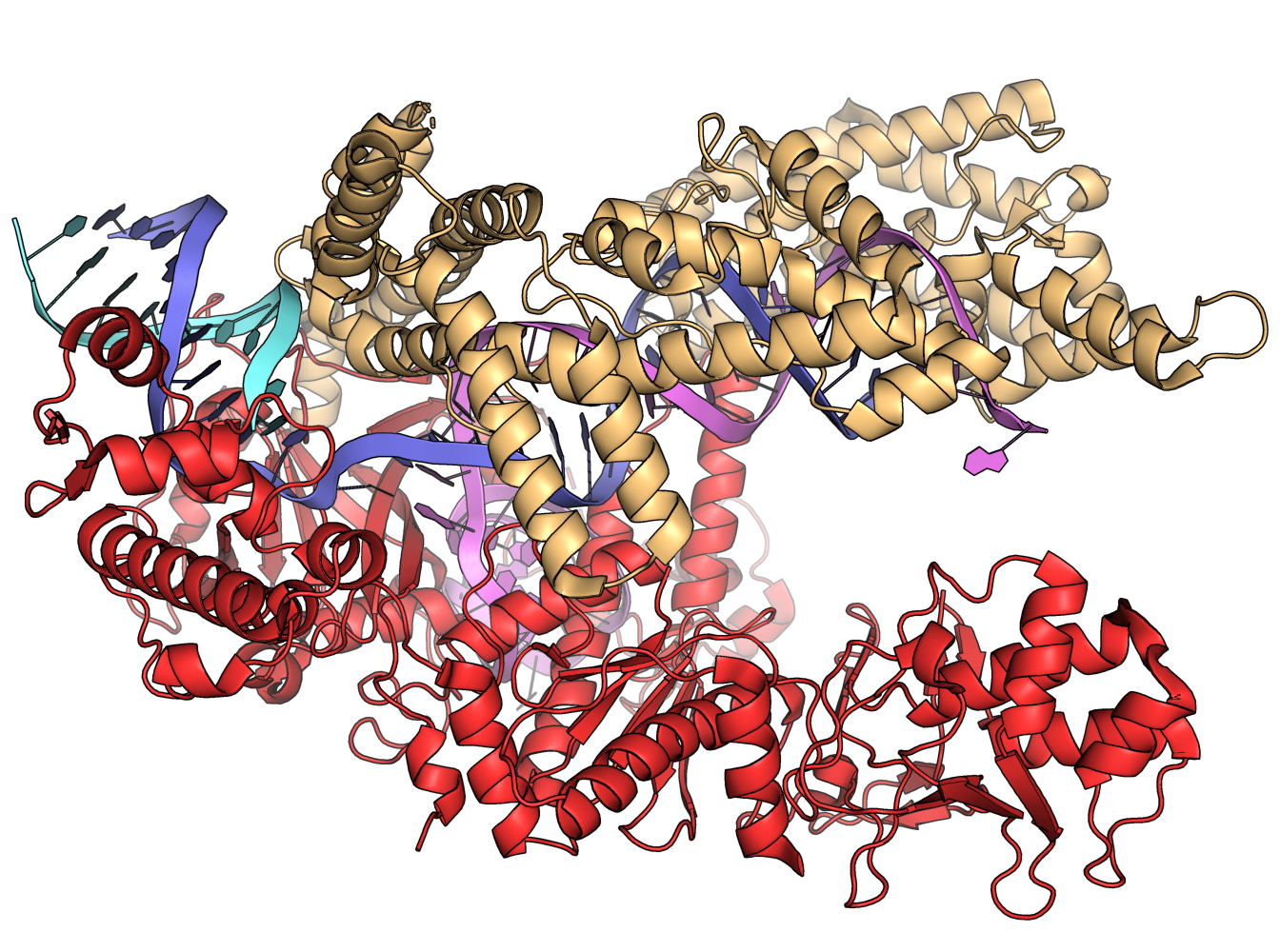
- Acidaminococcus sp. Cas12a PDB: 5B43

Identifiers
- Symbol: Cas12a
- InterPro: IPR027620
Available protein structures:
- PDB: IPR027620
- AlphaFold: IPR027620

Cas12a (CRISPR-associated protein 12a, previously Cpf1) is a Class II Type V CRISPR-associated endonuclease-exonuclease. In bacteria such as F. novicida, its natural context, Cas12a targets and destroys the genetic material of viruses and other foreign mobile genetic elements. In a target organism, crRNA contains a constant region that Cas12a recognizes and a "spacer" region that is complementary to a piece of foreign nucleic acid (e.g., a portion of a phage genome) that previously infected the cell.

Cas12a is distinct from Cas9: it generates staggered cuts in double-stranded DNA, in contrast to the blunt ends; it relies on a 'T-rich' protospacer adjacent motif (PAM) (typically 5'-TTTV-3', where V is A, C, or G), offering alternative sites compared to the 'G-rich' PAMs (typically 5'-NGG-3') favored by Cas9; and it requires only a CRISPR RNA (crRNA) for effective targeting, whereas Cas9 necessitates both a crRNA and a trans-activating crRNA (tracrRNA).

The programmable DNA-targeting activity of Cas12a makes it a useful tool for biotechnology and biological research applications. By modifying the spacer sequence in the crRNA, researchers can target Cas12a to a specific DNA sequence, allowing for targeted DNA modifications. Cas12a is distinguished from other Cas proteins by its single RuvC active site, its 5' protospacer adjacent motif preference, and its formation of sticky rather than blunt ends at the cut site; these and other differences make it more suitable for certain applications. Beyond basic research, the CRISPR-Cas12a system could have applications in genetic diseases and gene drives.

== Comparison with Cas9 ==
Cas12a's characteristics may confer advantages to Cas12a over Cas9 in the context of gene editing. For instance, the smaller size of Cas12a's crRNAs makes them well-suited for multiplexed genome editing, allowing for a greater number of guide RNAs to be packaged into a single vector compared to Cas9's single guide RNAs (sgRNAs). The sticky 5′ overhangs generated by Cas12a can also be utilized for DNA assembly with higher target specificity than traditional restriction enzyme cloning. Furthermore, Cas12a cleaves DNA 18–23 base pairs downstream from the PAM site. This characteristic ensures that the recognition sequence remains intact after repair, enabling Cas12a to perform multiple rounds of DNA cleavage. Conversely, Cas9 cleaves only 3 base pairs upstream of the PAM site, leading to indel mutations from the non-homologous end joining (NHEJ) pathway that can disrupt the recognition sequence, thereby preventing subsequent rounds of cutting. A notable feature of Cas12a, in contrast to Cas9, is its ability to remain bound to its target DNA after cleavage and subsequently cleave other single-stranded DNA molecules non-discriminately. This property, termed "collateral cleavage" or "trans-cleavage" activity, has been harnessed for the development of various diagnostic technologies.

While classified as a Class II Type V CRISPR-associated nuclease, Cas12a lacks the NHN endonuclease domain found in Cas9 and instead relies on its RuvC-like domain for sequential DNA cleavage, resulting in the production of staggered ends. Unlike Cas9, Cas12a possesses a unique zinc finger-like domain, which may contribute to DNA binding or structural stability. A significant advantage of Cas12a over Cas9 is its inherent RNase activity within the WED domain, enabling the self-processing of precursor crRNAs (pre-crRNAs) into mature crRNAs. This eliminates the requirement for a trans-activating crRNA (tracrRNA), simplifying guide RNA design and facilitating multiplexed editing through the packaging of multiple crRNAs into a single vector.

== Multiplex genome editing ==
Multiplex genome editing is a powerful technique that allows for the simultaneous editing of multiple genes. Cas12a is particularly useful in this context due to features that simplify its application compared to Cas9. For instance, Cas12a requires only a short CRISPR RNA (crRNA) to target and edit genes. These crRNAs can be easily multiplexed by packaging them together into a single delivery system, enabling the simultaneous editing of multiple genomic loci .

Furthermore, Cas12a and Cas9 exhibit differences in their protospacer adjacent motif (PAM) requirements. While Cas9 typically looks for G-rich sequences, Cas12a targets T-rich sequences. This difference expands the range of targetable genomic sites, allowing Cas12a to edit genes in regions where Cas9 may not be efficient, such as AT-rich areas prevalent in plant genomes, providing greater flexibility for researchers.

The ability of Cas12a to deliver its own crRNA (CRISPR RNA) without the need for additional components like the tracrRNA required by Cas9 further simplifies the design and delivery of guide RNAs for multiplexed editing.

== Description ==
=== Discovery ===
CRISPR-Cas12a was found by searching a published database of bacterial genetic sequences for promising bits of DNA. Its identification through bioinformatics as a CRISPR system protein, its naming, and a hidden Markov model (HMM) for its detection were provided in 2012 in a release of the TIGRFAMs database of protein families. Cas12a appears in many bacterial species. The ultimate Cas12a endonuclease that was developed into a tool for genome editing was taken from one of the first 16 species known to harbor it. Two candidate enzymes from Acidaminococcus and Lachnospiraceae display efficient genome-editing activity in human cells.

=== Classification ===
CRISPR-Cas systems are separated into two classes: Class I, in which several Cas proteins associate with a crRNA to build a functional endonuclease, and Class II, in which a single Cas endonuclease associates with a crRNA; Class II is further divided into Type II, Type V, and Type VI systems. Cas12a is identified as a Class II, Type V CRISPR-Cas system.

=== Naming ===
The acronym CRISPR (Clustered Regularly Interspaced Short Palindromic Repeats) refers to the invariant DNA sequences found in bacteria and archaea which encode Cas proteins and their crRNAs. Cas12a was originally known as Cpf1, an abbreviation of CRISPR and two genera of bacteria where it appears, Prevotella and Francisella. It was renamed in 2015 after a broader rationalization of the names of Cas (CRISPR associated) proteins to correspond to their sequence homology.

== Structure ==
The Cas12a protein contains a mixed alpha/beta domain, a RuvC-like endonuclease domain (broken into two non-contiguous segments, RuvC-I and RuvC-II) similar to the RuvC domain of Cas9, and a zinc finger-like domain. Unlike Cas9, Cas12a does not have an HNH endonuclease domain, and the N-terminal region of Cas12a does not have an alpha-helical recognition lobe as seen in Cas9.

The Cas12a loci encode Cas1, Cas2 and Cas4 proteins more similar to types I and III than from type II systems. Database searches suggest the abundance of Cas12a-family proteins in many bacterial species.

Also unlike Cas9, Cas12a does not require a tracrRNA (which in natural CRISPR systems must base-pair with a separate crRNA before binding to a Cas protein), instead binding a single crRNA. Both Cas12a and its guide RNA are smaller than the protein and RNA components of the Cas9 system; the crRNA of Cas12a is approximately half as long as sgRNAs used with Cas9. This reduced size renders Cas12a more suitable for applications such as in vivo delivery via adeno-associated virus (AAV), which have limited DNA packaging capacity due to their small capsids.

The Cas12a-crRNA complex cleaves target DNA or RNA by identification of a protospacer adjacent motif (PAM) 5'-YTN-3' (where "Y" is a pyrimidine and "N" is any nucleobase), in contrast to the G-rich PAM targeted by Cas9. After identification of PAM, Cas12a introduces a sticky-end-like DNA double- stranded break of 4 or 5 nucleotides overhang.

== Mechanism ==
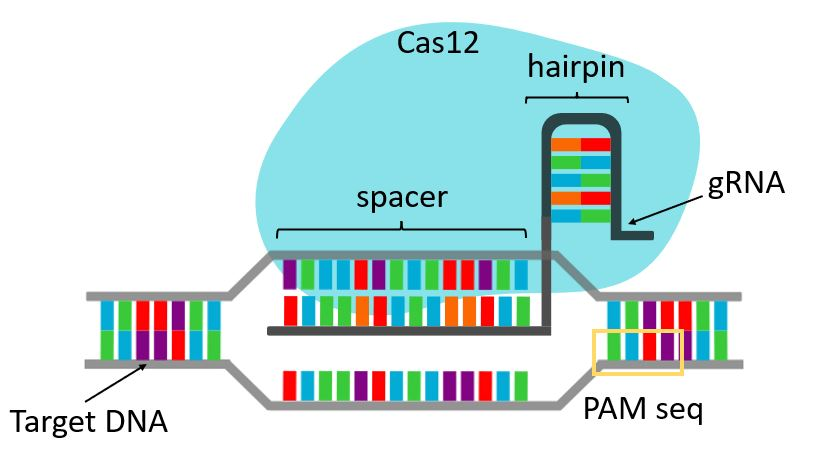

The CRISPR-Cas12a system consist of a Cas12a enzyme and a guide RNA that finds and positions the complex at the correct spot on the double helix to cleave target DNA. CRISPR-Cas12a systems activity has three stages:

- Adaptation: Cas1 and Cas2 proteins facilitate the adaptation of small fragments of DNA into the CRISPR array.
- Formation of crRNAs: processing of pre-cr-RNAs producing of mature crRNAs to guide the Cas protein.
- Interference: the Cas12a is bound to a crRNA to form a binary complex to identify and cleave a target DNA sequence. The crRNA-Cas12a complex searches dsDNA for a 3-6nt 5' protospacer adjacent motif (PAM). Once a PAM is found, the protein locally denatures the dsDNA and searches for complementarity between the crRNA spacer and the ssDNA protospacer. Sufficient complementarity will trigger RuvC activity and the RuvC active site will then cut the non-target strand and then the target strand, ultimately generating a staggered dsDNA break with 5' ssDNA overhangs (cis cleavage).

=== Cas9 vs. Cas12a ===
Cas12a and Cas9 nucleases and their DNA cleavage positions

Cas9 requires two RNA molecules to cut DNA while Cas12a needs one. The proteins also cut DNA at different places, offering researchers more options when selecting an editing site. Cas9 cuts both strands in a DNA molecule at the same position, leaving behind blunt ends. Cas12a leaves one strand longer than the other, creating sticky ends. The sticky ends have different properties than blunt ends during non-homologous end joining or homologous repair of DNA, which confers certain advantages to Cas12a when attempting gene insertions, compared to Cas9. Although the CRISPR-Cas9 system can efficiently disable genes, it is challenging to insert genes or generate a knock-in. Cas12a lacks tracrRNA, utilizes a T-rich PAM and cleaves DNA via a staggered DNA DSB.

In summary, important differences between Cas12a and Cas9 systems are that Cas12a:

- Recognizes different PAMs, enabling new targeting possibilities.
- Creates 4-5 nt long sticky ends, instead of blunt ends produced by Cas9, enhancing the efficiency of genetic insertions and specificity during NHEJ or HDR.
- Cuts target DNA further away from PAM, further away from the Cas9 cutting site, enabling new possibilities for cleaving the DNA.

Feature	Cas9	Cas12a
Structure	Two RNA required (Or 1 fusion transcript (crRNA+tracrRNA=sgRNA)	One crRNA required
Cutting mechanism	Blunt end cuts	Staggered end cuts
Cutting site	Proximal to recognition site	Distal from recognition site
Target sites	G-rich PAM	T-rich PAM

== Origin ==
Cas12 endonucleases ultimately likely evolved from the TnpB endonuclease of IS200/IS605-family transposons. TnpB, not yet "domesticated" into the CRISPR immune system, are themselves able to perform RNA-guided cleavage using a OmegaRNA template system.

== Tools ==
Multiple aspects influence target efficiency and specificity when using CRISPR, including guide RNA design. Many design models and CRISPR-Cas software tools for optimal design of guide RNA have been developed. These include SgRNA designer, CRISPR MultiTargeter, SSFinder. In addition, commercial antibodies are available for use to detect Cas12a protein.
