= Trans-regulatory element =

Trans-regulatory elements (TRE) are DNA sequences encoding upstream regulators (ie. trans-acting factors), which may modify or regulate the expression of distant genes. Trans-acting factors interact with cis-regulatory elements to regulate gene expression. TRE mediates expression profiles of a large number of genes via trans-acting factors. While TRE mutations affect gene expression, it is also one of the main driving factors for evolutionary divergence in gene expression.

== Trans vs cis elements ==
Trans-regulatory elements work through an intermolecular interaction between two different molecules and so are said to be "acting in trans". For example (1) a transcribed and translated transcription factor protein derived from the trans-regulatory element; and a (2) DNA regulatory element that is adjacent to the regulated gene. This is in contrast to cis-regulatory elements that work through an intramolecular interaction between different parts of the same molecule: (1) a gene; and (2) an adjacent regulatory element for that gene in the same DNA molecule. Additionally, each trans-regulatory element affects a large number of genes on both alleles, while cis-regulatory element is allele specific and only controls genes nearby.

Exonic and promoter sequences of the genes are significantly more conserved than the genes in cis- and trans- regulatory elements. Hence, they have higher resistance to genetic divergence, yet retains its susceptibility to mutations in upstream regulators. This accentuates the significance of genetic divergence within species due to cis- and trans-regulatory variants.

Trans- and cis-regulatory elements co-evolved rapidly in large-scale to maintain gene expression. They often act in opposite directions, one up-regulates while another down-regulates, to compensate for their effects on the exonic and promoter sequences they act on. Other evolutionary models, such as the independent evolution of trans- or cis-regulatory elements, were deemed incompatible in regulatory systems. Co-evolution of the two regulatory elements was suggested to arise from the same lineage.

TRE is more evolutionary constraint than cis-regulatory element, suggesting a hypothesis that TRE mutations are corrected by CRE mutations to maintain stability in gene expression. This makes biological sense, due to TRE's effect on a broad range of genes and CRE's compensatory effect on specific genes. Following a TRE mutation, accumulation of CRE mutations act to fine-tune the mutative effect.

== Examples ==
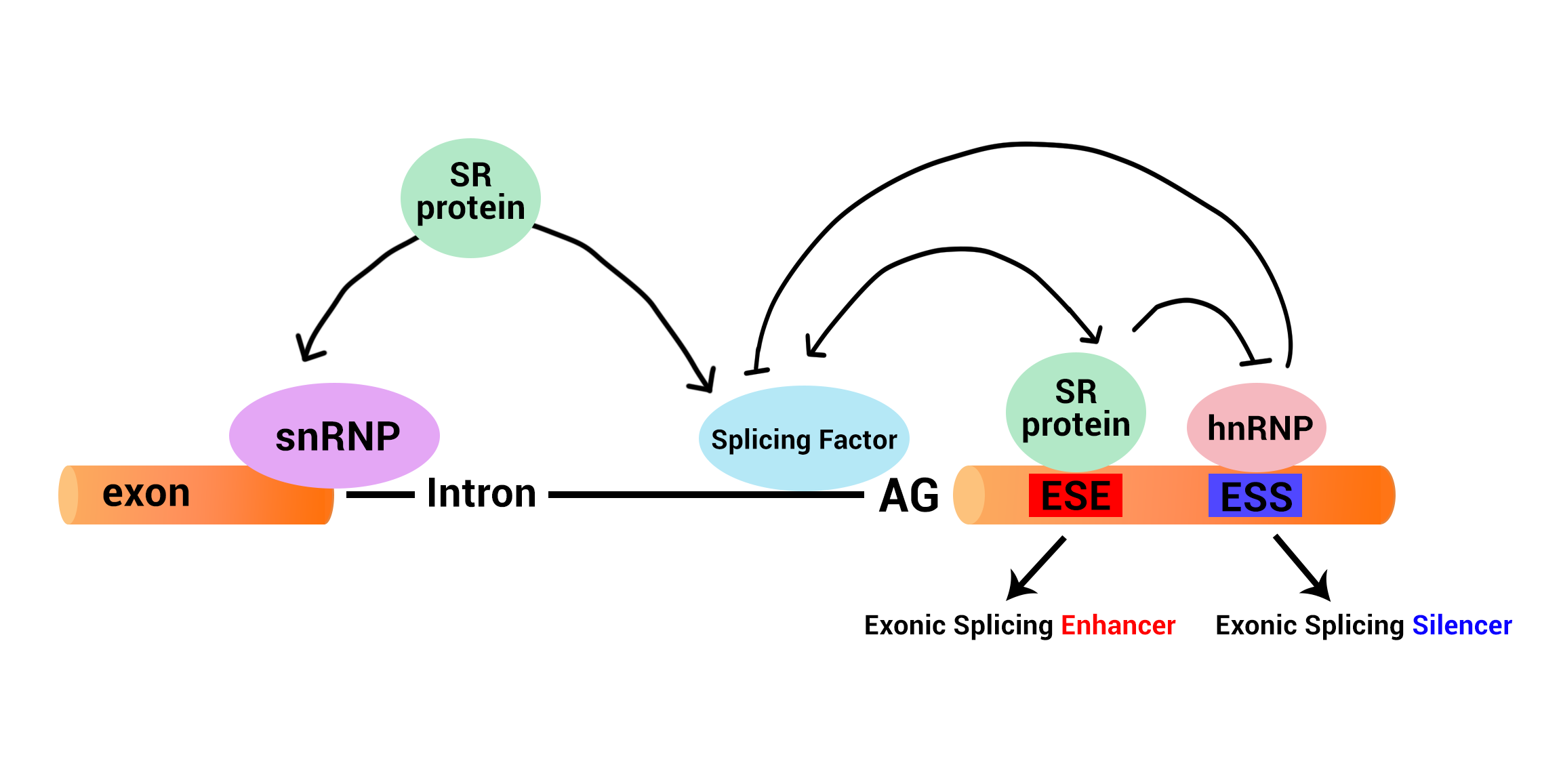
Trans-acting factors in alternative splicing in mRNA. Alternative splicing is a key mechanism that is involved in gene expression regulation. In the alternative splicing, trans-acting factors such as SR protein, hnRNP and snRNP control this mechanism by acting in trans. SR protein promotes the spliceosome assembly by interacting with snRNP(e.g. U1, U2) and splicing factors(e.g. U2AF65), and it can also antagonize the activity of hnRNP that inhibits splicing.

Trans-acting factors can be categorized by their interactions with the regulated genes, cis-acting elements of the genes, or the gene products.

=== DNA binding ===
DNA binding trans-acting factors regulate gene expression by interfering with the gene itself or cis-acting elements of the gene, which lead to changes in transcription activities. This can be direct initiation of transcription, promotion, or repression of transcriptional protein activities.

Specific examples include:

- Transcription factors

=== DNA editing ===
DNA editing proteins edit and permanently change gene sequence, and subsequently the gene expression of the cell. All progenies of the cell will inherit the edited gene sequence. DNA editing proteins often take part in the immune response system of both prokaryotes and eukaryotes, providing high variance in gene expression in adaptation to various pathogens.

Specific examples include:

- RAG1/RAG2
- TdT
- Cas1/Cas2

=== mRNA processing ===
mRNA processing acts as a form of post-transcriptional regulation, which mostly happens in eukaryotes. 3′ cleavage/polyadenylation and 5’ capping increase overall RNA stability, and the presence of 5’ cap allows ribosome binding for translation. RNA splicing allows the expression of various protein variants from the same gene.

Specific examples include:

- SR proteins
- Ribonucleoprotein
  - hnRNP
  - snRNP

=== mRNA binding ===
mRNA binding allows repression of protein translation through direct blocking, degradation or cleavage of mRNA. Certain mRNA binding mechanisms have high specificity, which can act as a form of the intrinsic immune response during certain viral infections. Certain segmented RNA viruses can also regulate viral gene expression through RNA binding of another genome segment, however, the details of this mechanism are still unclear.

Specific examples include:

- RNA binding protein
- siRNA
- miRNA
- piRNA

== See also ==
- Cis-regulatory element
