= CspA mRNA 5′ UTR =

cspA 5' UTR
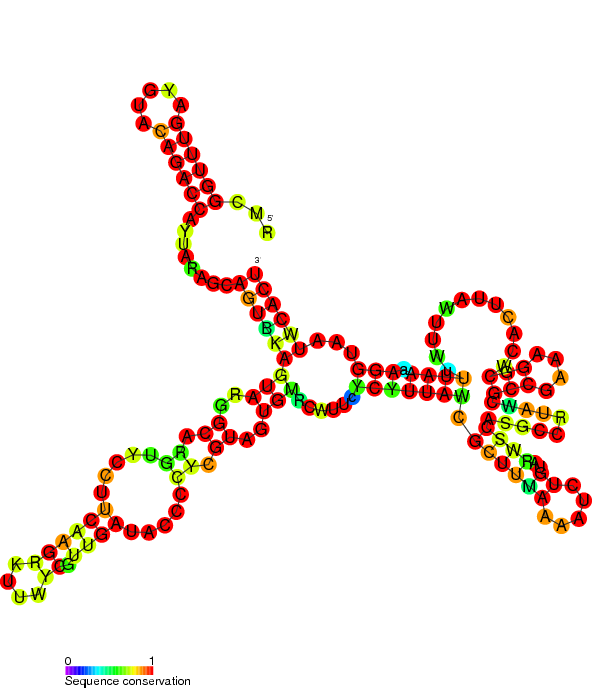
- Conserved secondary structure of the 5' UTR of cspA RNA

Identifiers
- Symbol: cspA 5'UTR
- Rfam: RF01766

Other data
- RNA type: Cis-reg; Thermoregulator;
- Domain: Enterobacteriales
- PDB structures: PDBe

cspA mRNA 5' UTR is the untranslated region of the cspA gene, which is important in the cold shock response in Enterobacteriales such as E. coli. The 5' UTR element acts as an RNA thermometer, regulating the expression of cspA in response to temperature. By regulating temperature, cspA proteins carry out the vital function of homeostasis.

The 5' UTR was first suspected to be significant when mutations within this region of cspA significantly increased the stability of the transcript at 37°C.

The secondary structure of cspA mRNA changes in response to temperature; at 37 °C the transcript is unstable and less efficiently translated than at lower temperatures. Unlike other RNA thermometers (such as FourU), the secondary structure is not reliant on the melting of a hairpin in order to affect gene expression. Instead, in temperatures below 20 °C a cis-regulatory region of ncRNA in the 5' UTR of cspA presents the Shine-Dalgarno sequence and AUG start codon to the ribosome in a more accessible way. The precise mechanism for changing the mRNA conformation is unknown. cspA protein is then produced in significantly higher quantities, making up over 2% of the cell's proteome during cold shock. cspA protein binds Hfq, which upregulates production of sigma factors which mediate a stress response.

== See also ==
- Hfq binding sRNA
- ROSE element
