= CSPA =

CSPA can stand for:

- Canadian Sport Parachuting Association, governs parachuting sports
- Child Soldiers Prevention Act, a US law enacted to address the problem of children losing their eligibility for immigration benefits because they had aged-out as a result of processing delays
- Chinese Student Protection Act of 1992, a bill sponsored by US Representative Nancy Pelosi (D-CA) which granted permanent residency to all Chinese nationals who arrived in the United States on or before April 11, 1990.
- Columbia Scholastic Press Association, a program of the School of Professional Studies at Columbia University in the City of New York.
- Consumer Specialty Products Association, an industry trade association
- CspA mRNA 5′ UTR, part of the messenger RNA of the major cold shock protein CspA
