= RNA thermometer =

Temperature-dependent RNA structure

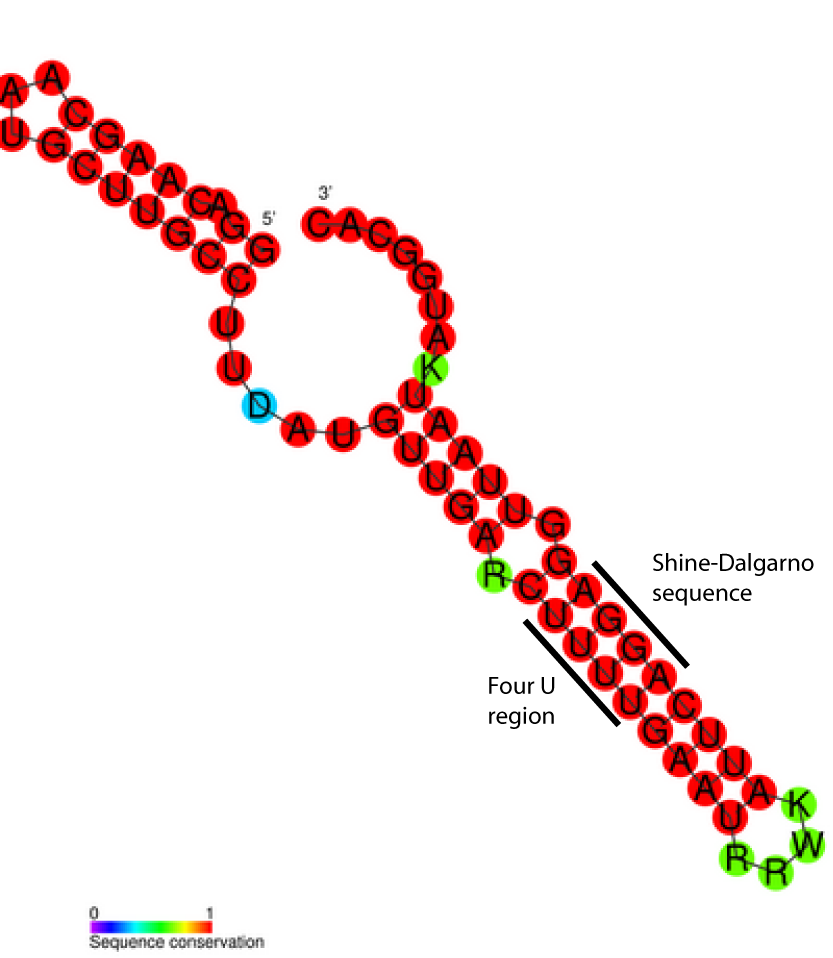
The FourU thermometer RNA motif, with the Shine-Dalgarno sequence highlighted.

An RNA thermometer (or RNA thermosensor) is a temperature-sensitive non-coding RNA molecule which regulates gene expression. Its unique characteristic it is that it does not need proteins or metabolites to function, but only reacts to temperature changes. RNA thermometers often regulate genes required during either a heat shock or cold shock response, but have been implicated in other regulatory roles such as in pathogenicity and starvation.

In general, RNA thermometers operate by changing their secondary structure and tertiary structure in response to temperature fluctuations. This structural transition can then expose or occlude important regions of RNA such as a ribosome binding site, which then affects the translation rate of a nearby protein-coding gene.

RNA thermometers, along with riboswitches, are used as examples in support of the RNA world hypothesis. This theory proposes that RNA was once the sole nucleic acid present in cells, and was replaced by the current DNA → RNA → protein system.

Examples of RNA thermometers include FourU, the Hsp90 cis-regulatory element, the ROSE element, the Lig RNA thermometer, and the Hsp17 thermometer.

== Discovery ==
The first temperature-sensitive RNA element was reported in 1989. Prior to this research, mutations upstream from the transcription start site in a lambda (λ) phage cIII mRNA were found to affect the level of translation of the cIII protein. This protein is involved in selection of either a lytic or lysogenic life cycle in λ phage, with high concentrations of cIII promoting lysogeny. Further study of this upstream RNA region identified two alternative secondary structures; experimental study found the structures to be interchangeable, and dependent on both magnesium ion concentration and temperature. This RNA thermometer is now thought to encourage entry to a lytic cycle under heat stress in order for the bacteriophage to rapidly replicate and escape the host cell.

The term "RNA thermometer" was not coined until 1999, when it was applied to the rpoH RNA element identified in Escherichia coli. More recently, bioinformatics searches have been employed to uncover several novel candidate RNA thermometers. Traditional sequence-based searches are inefficient, however, as the secondary structure of the element is much more conserved than the nucleic acid sequence.

Biological reactions and organism are sensitive to temperature for cell function. RNA thermometers are an efficient way to respond to temperature because as they allow cells to monitor and sense changes to maintain the cell alive and stable. DNA, RNA, or protein-induced mechanisms avoid small changes because by sensing any external changes

Bacteria use RNA thermometers to enter and survive in their hosts by mounting themselves to their host and causing fluctuations in their temperature. The bacteria can respond quickly against heat-shock and cold-shock conditions since RNA thermometers control gene expression at a translational level.

The first RNA thermometer discovered in chloroplast of Chlamydomonas reinhardtii, found in the 5'-UTR of the psaA mRNA. Its function was different especially because it was considered absent, it has a hairpin-type secondary structure that protects the Shine–Dalgarno sequence when temperature is low, but once a change occurs in temperature, it melts and activates protein production. C. reinhardtii's RNA thermometer research is the entryway to observing the chloroplast of photosynthetic organisms for gene regulation and how it can be used for agriculture at some point in the future since it helps plants get accustomed to external temperature.

== Distribution ==
Most known RNA thermometers are located in the 5′ untranslated region (UTR) of messenger RNA encoding heat shock proteins—though it has been suggested this fact may be due, in part, to sampling bias and inherent difficulties of detecting short, unconserved RNA sequences in genomic data.

Though predominantly found in prokaryotes, a potential RNA thermometer has been found in mammals including humans. The candidate thermosensor heat shock RNA-1 (HSR1) activates heat-shock transcription factor 1 (HSF1) and induces protective proteins when cell temperature exceeds 37 °C (body temperature), thus preventing the cells from overheating.

The first RNA thermometer discovered in chloroplast of Chlamydomonas reinhardtii, found in the 5'-UTR of the psaA mRNA. Its function was different especially because it was considered absent, it has a hairpin-type secondary structure that protects the Shine–Dalgarno sequence when temperature is low, but once a change occurs in temperature, it melts and activates protein production. C. reinhardtii's RNA thermometer research is the entryway to observing the chloroplast of photosynthetic organisms for gene regulation and how it can be used for agriculture at some point in the future since it helps plants get accustomed to external temperature.

ROSE elements, are a bacterial RNA thermometer class that regulates the activation of genes that have small heat shock proteins. It melts at a moderate level parallel to the increase of the temperature surrounding its environment. Once it fully melts at a high temperature of ~42 °C, it proceeds to release of Shine–Dalgarno and the AUG start codon. RNA Thermometers can also be found in some plant symbiotes or pathogens, symbiotes and pathogens use the RNA thermometers to regulate the plant's gene expression. A well studied symbiotic bacteria is the Rhizobiaceae family. In majority of the rhizobial species, ROSE elements (cis-acting) were visible controlling heat-shock genes.

== Structure ==
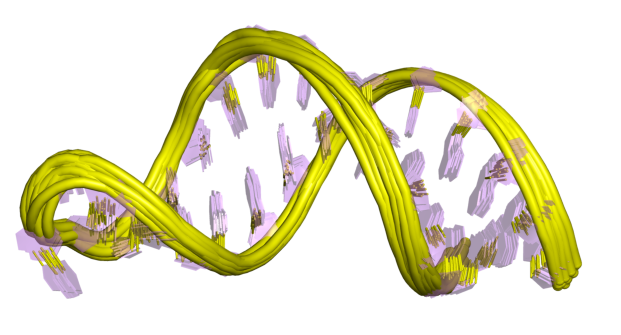
3D representation of the structure of the ROSE RNA thermometer.

RNA thermometers are structurally simple and can be made from short RNA sequences; the smallest is just 44 nucleotides and is found in the mRNA of a heat-shock protein, hsp17, in Synechocystis species PCC 6803. Generally these RNA elements range in length from 60 to 110 nucleotides and they typically contain a hairpin with a small number of mismatched base pairs which reduce the stability of the structure, thereby allowing easier unfolding in response to a temperature increase.

Detailed structural analysis of the ROSE RNA thermometer revealed that the mismatched bases are actually engaged in nonstandard basepairing that preserves the helical structure of the RNA (see figure). The unusual basepairs consist of G-G, U-U, and UC-U pairs. Since these noncanonical base pairs are relatively unstable, increased temperature causes local melting of the RNA structure in this region, exposing the Shine-Dalgarno sequence.

Some RNA thermometers are significantly more complex than a single hairpin, as in the case of a region found in CspA mRNA which is thought to contain a pseudoknot, as well as multiple hairpins.

Synthetic RNA thermometers have been designed with just a simple single-hairpin structure. However, the secondary structure of such short RNA thermometers can be sensitive to mutation, as a single base change can render the hairpin inactive in vivo.

== Mechanism ==
A stable hairpin (left) unwinds at a higher temperature (right). The highlighted Shine-Dalgarno sequence becomes exposed, allowing the binding of the 30S ribosomal subunit.

RNA thermometers are found in the 5′ UTR of messenger RNA, upstream of a protein-coding gene. Here they are able to occlude the ribosome binding site (RBS) and prevent translation of the mRNA into protein. As temperature increases, the hairpin structure can 'melt' and expose the RBS or Shine-Dalgarno sequence to permit binding of the small ribosomal subunit (30S), which then assembles other translation machinery. The start codon, typically found 8 nucleotides downstream of the Shine-Dalgarno sequence, signals the beginning of a protein-coding gene which is then translated to a peptide product by the ribosome. In addition to this cis-acting mechanism, a lone example of a trans-acting RNA thermometer has been found in RpoS mRNA where it is thought to be involved in the starvation response.

A specific example of an RNA thermometer motif is the FourU thermometer found in Salmonella enterica. When exposed to temperatures above 45 °C, the stem-loop that base-pairs opposite the Shine-Dalgarno sequence becomes unpaired and allows the mRNA to enter the ribosome for translation to occur. Mg^{2+} ion concentration has also been shown to affect the stability of FourU. The most well-studied RNA thermometer is found in the rpoH gene in Escherichia coli. This thermosensor upregulates heat shock proteins under high temperatures through σ^{32}, a specialised heat-shock sigma factor.

Though typically associated with heat-induced protein expression, RNA thermometers can also regulate cold-shock proteins. For example, the expression of two 7kDa proteins are regulated by an RNA thermometer in the thermophilic bacterium Thermus thermophilus and a similar mechanism has been identified in Enterobacteriales.

RNA thermometers sensitive to temperatures of 37 °C can be used by pathogens to activate infection-specific genes. For example, the upregulation of prfA, encoding a key transcriptional regulator of virulence genes in Listeria monocytogenes, was demonstrated by fusing the 5′ DNA of prfA to the green fluorescent protein gene; the gene fusion was then transcribed from the T7 promoter in E. coli, and fluorescence was observed at 37 °C but not at 30 °C.

== Implications for the RNA world hypothesis ==
The RNA world hypothesis states that RNA was once both the carrier of hereditary information and enzymatically active, with different sequences acting as biocatalysts, regulators and sensors. The hypothesis then proposes that modern DNA, RNA and protein-based life evolved and selection replaced the majority of RNA's roles with other biomolecules.

RNA thermometers and riboswitches are thought to be evolutionarily ancient due to their wide-scale distribution in distantly-related organisms. It has been proposed that, in the RNA world, RNA thermosensors would have been responsible for temperature-dependent regulation of other RNA molecules. RNA thermometers in modern organisms may be molecular fossils which could hint at a previously more widespread importance in an RNA world.

== Other examples ==
- The transcription factor PIF7 in Arabidopsis thaliana contains an RNA thermoswitch in its 5' UTR that enhances protein synthesis at higher temperatures, helping the plant to adapt rapidly to temperature changes.
- Hsp90 cis-regulatory element regulates hsp90 in Drosophila, increasing the translation rate of the heat shock protein at high temperatures.
- The ibpAB operon of E. coli is predicted to contain two co-operative RNA thermometers: a ROSE element and the IbpB thermometer.
- ROSE_{1} and ROSE_{AT2} are found in hyphomicrobiales Bradyrhizobium japonicum and Agrobacterium tumefaciens respectively. They exist in the 5′ UTR of HspA mRNA, and repress heat shock protein translation at physiological temperatures.
- Cyanobacterial RNA thermometers
- Intergenic RNA thermometer
- Neisseria RNA thermometers
- Lig RNA thermometer
