= Aggregatibacter iron-regulated sRNA =

Four non-coding small RNAs containing a Fur box-like (ferric uptake regulator) sequence were identified by bioinformatics analysis in Aggregatibacter actinomycetemcomitans HK1651 called JA01-JA04. The transcription of sRNAs was confirmed by Northern blot. Fur binding was demonstrated to each sRNA promoter, and that transcription of the sRNAs was decreased in presence of iron and increased by iron limitation. JA03 may have the ability to regulate biofilm formation. JA01 is conserved only among A. actinomycetemcomitans. JA02 is present in both A. actinomycetemcomitans and P. multocida. JA 03 and JA04 are most widely conserved and have orthologues across many Pasteurellaceae. HrrF RNA is another Fur-regulated sRNA conserved among the Pasteurcellaceae.

== See also ==
- RhyB RNA
- PrrF RNA
- NrrF RNA
