= IbpB thermometer =

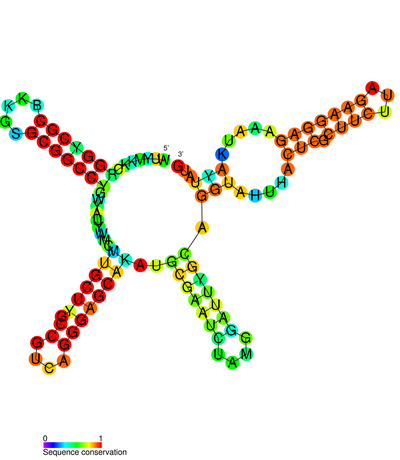
- Conserved secondary structure of the IbpB thermometer

Identifiers
- Symbol: ibpB 5' UTR

Other data
- RNA type: RNA thermometer
- Domain(s): E. coli
- PDB structures: PDBe

The IbpB thermometer is an RNA thermometer element found in the ibpAB operon. The operon contains two heat-shock genes, encoding inclusion body binding proteins A and B (IbpA/B), and is the most drastically upregulated operon under heat-shock in Escherichia coli.

IbpA is regulated by a ROSE element found in its 5' UTR, while IbpB has its own heat-sensitive cis-regulatory element. The activity of this thermoregulator was confirmed in vitro but was not found in vivo, suggesting more complicated operon regulation exists in bacterial cells.

== IbpB protein ==
The IbpB protein, whose expression is regulated by the IbpB thermometer, is 48% identical to IbpA (at the level of amino acid sequence) yet fulfils a different role in heat shock. When IbpB is absent, IbpA protein will form long fibrils which is unusual for a heat shock protein; IbpB, acting as a co-chaperone, inhibits IbpA from forming this structure.

Under heat shock, IbpB protein dissociates to give two smaller subunits and also rearranges its tertiary structure. This "remarkable conformational transformation" is thought to be essential for IbpB to act as a co-chaperone with IbpA under heat shock.

IbpB has been found to retain active for a significant time after a heat shock stimulus has been removed.
