= IBPB =

IBPB may refer to:

- IbpB, a protein
- Indirect Branch Prediction Barrier, an extended feature flag for the x86 architecture
