= Cas4 =

Protein used in CRISPR

CRISPR-associated protein 4
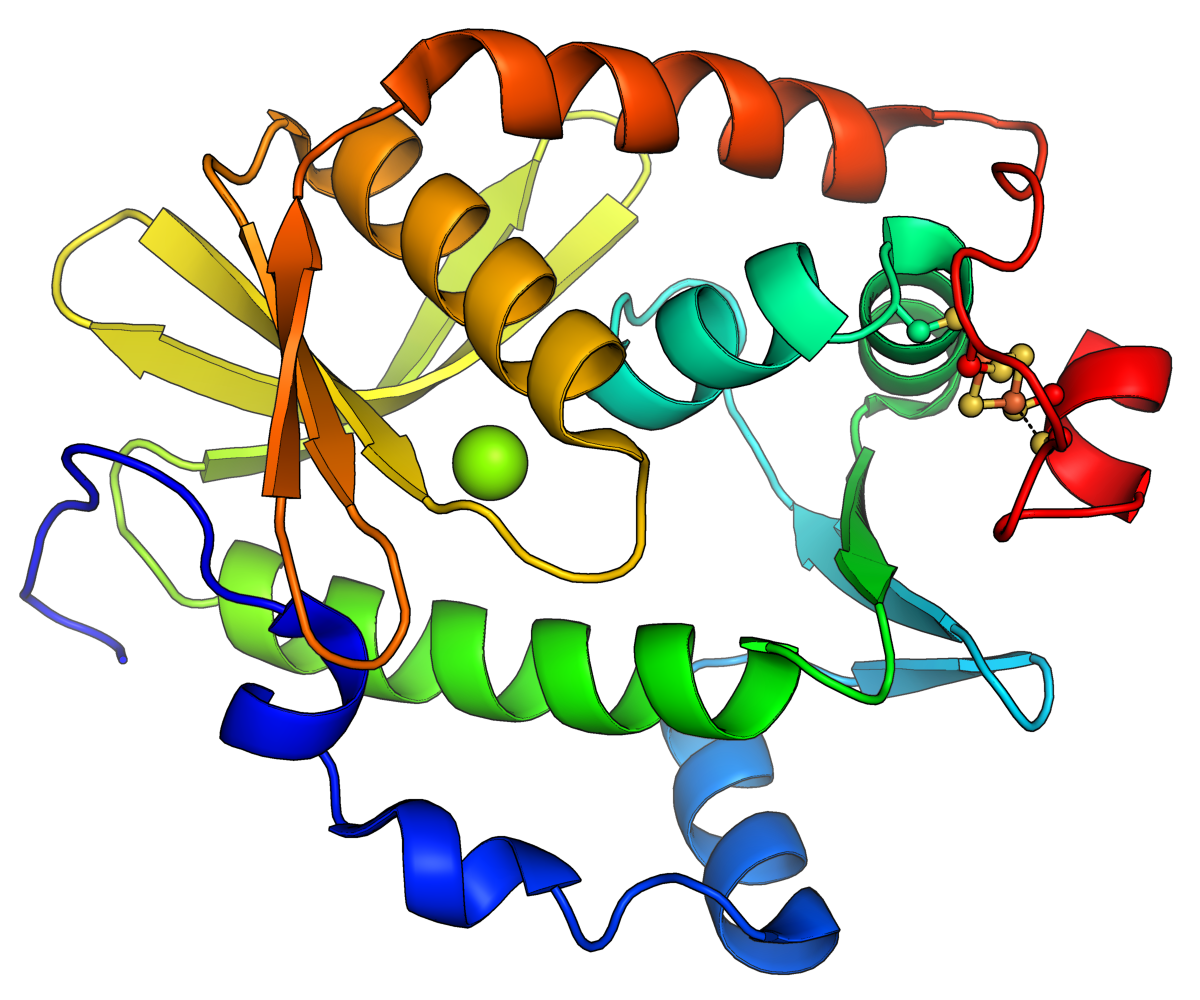
- Pyrobaculum calidifontis Cas4, PDB: 4R5Q

Identifiers
- Symbol: cas4
- Pfam: PF01930
- InterPro: IPR022765
Available protein structures:
- PDB: IPR022765 PF01930 (ECOD; PDBsum)
- AlphaFold: IPR022765; PF01930

Cas4 is an endonuclease found in some CRISPR systems that is used as part of the spacer acquisition stage. Cas4 family proteins belonging to the archaeon Sulfolobus solfataricus use four cysteine residues to bind an iron-sulfer cluster like those of the AddB nuclease of Bacillus subtilis. The Cas4 family protein Sso0001 codes is single stranded DNA 5' to 3' exonuclease that in vitro is stalled by extrahelical DNA adducts. Cas4 functions to resection to generate recombiongenic 3' single stranded DNA overhands in the DNA duplex strand.

Cas4 captures and stores short DNA fragments called "spacers" from different elements into host genomic CRISPR arrays to keep immunity against viruses and foreign mobile elements. All CRISPR-Cas systems recognize and cut "protospacers" to the correct size while joining the "spacers" into genomic CRISPR arrays in correct orientation. "protospacers" are recognized by 2- to 5-bp flanking protospacer-adjacent motif (PAM) to orientate and insert into CRISPR arrays. Cas4 cleaves upstream of PAM sequences to ensure the spacers are functional. The orientation of spacers occurs during virto integration in similar frequencies with Cas1 and Cas2 proteins. The correct orientation is highly favored in vivo to function for target recognition.

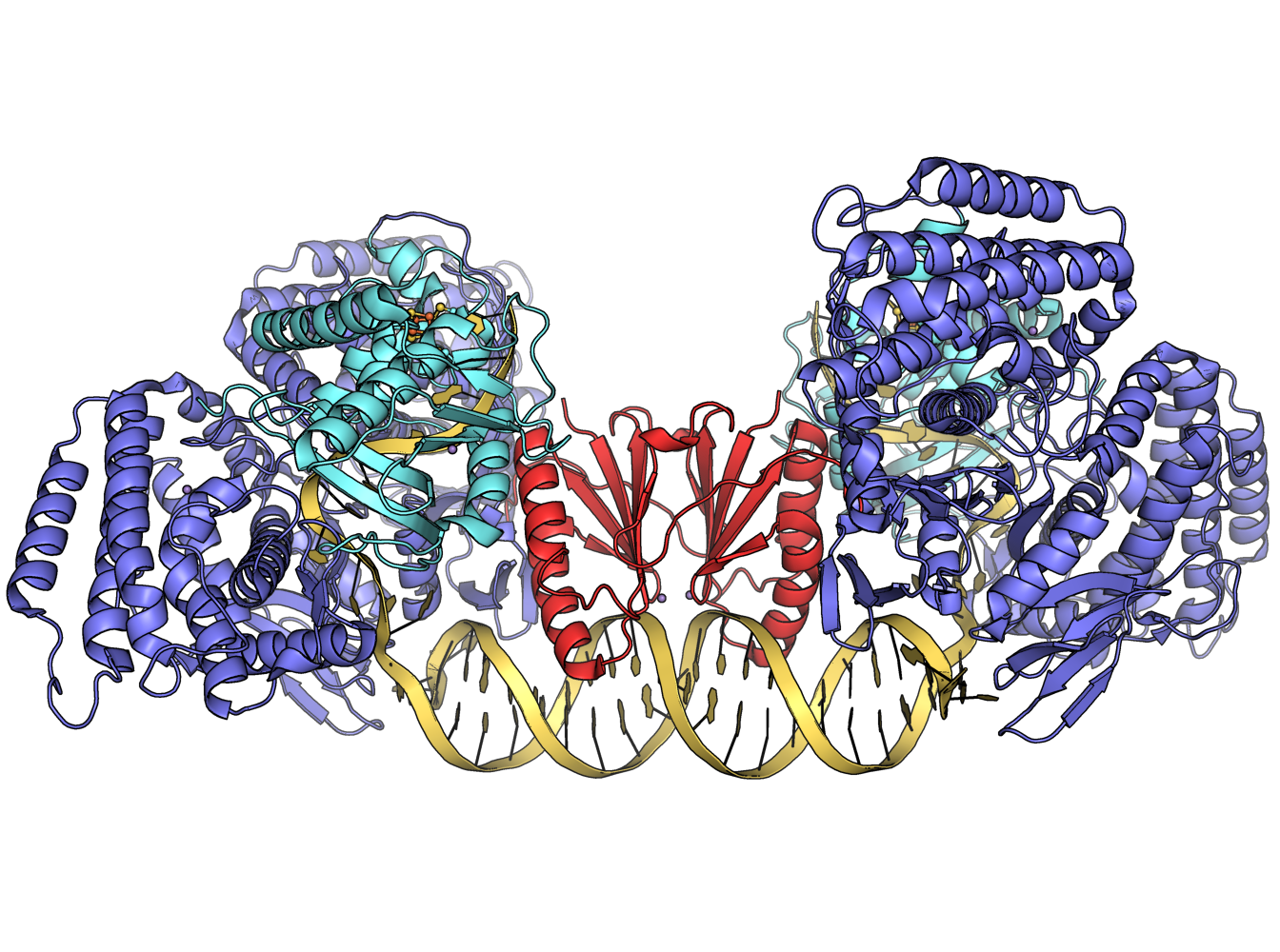
Bacillus subtilis. Geobacter sulfurreducens Cas1-Cas2-Cas4 complex bound to double stranded protospacer adjacent motif (PAM) spacer DNA. Cas1 homodimers (blue) bind to each side of the Cas2 homodimer (red) with a Cas4 Fe-S nuclease (cyan) bridging the two. The 3′ end of each DNA strand threads into the Cas4 active site. PDB: 7MI4

The Cas4 protein is a main protein for CRISPR by preventing non-functional spacer and ensuring fidelity of the adjustment. CRISPR-Cas is an adaptive immune reserve to pace with evolving mobile genetic elements like plasmids and bacteriophages. The CRISPR-Cas has three stages through immunity is adaptation, expression and interference. Cas4 exhibits DNA unwinding, exonuclease and endonuclease activity. Two Cas4 proteins are used to coordinate PAM recognition, pre-spacer trimming and 3' overhang removal, and integration of the spacer DNAs into the CRISPR array that orientates to result in functional crRNA with target DNA interaction to CRISPR immunity. The array is a source for small RNAs guding Cas nuclease complexes to their targets.

Cas4 is required for efficient prespacer processing by forming a Cas4-Cas1-Cas2 complex. In this complex, Cas4 cuts double-stranded substrates with long 3'-overhangs through site-specific endonucleolytic cleavage. Cas4 closely interacts with the integrase active sites of Cas1, recognizes PAM sequences within the substrate and cleaves precisely upstream of them, ensuring the acquisition of functional spacers. Cas4 acts as a nuclease and molecular checkpoint within the adaptation machinery. Cas4 protein with Cas1-Cas2 allows for compatible sequences with downstream interference are incorporated.
