= NrrF RNA =

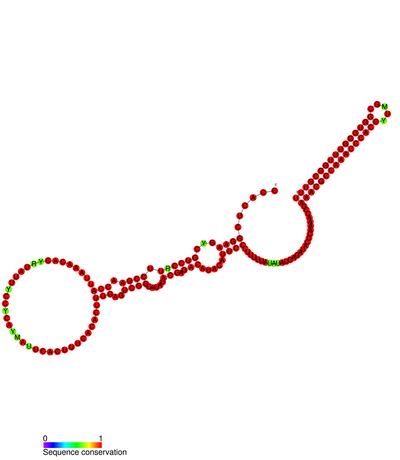
- Predicted secondary structure of NrrF RNA

Identifiers
- Symbol: NrrF
- Rfam: RF01416

Other data
- RNA type: gene, antisense RNA
- Domain(s): Neisseria
- PDB structures: PDBe

NrrF is a non-coding RNA which is regulated by the Ferric uptake regulator (Fur) protein in bacteria. This non-coding RNA was identified in Neisseria meningitidis and is involved in iron regulation of the succinate dehydrogenase genes sdhA and sdhC. NrrF acts as an antisense RNA and is complementary to the junction between the second and third genes of the sdh operon (sdhD and sdhA). Secondary structure predictions have indicated that this interaction occurs in a single stranded loop region of the NrrF RNA. Under low iron concentration NrrF is present at a high concentration and forms a duplex with the transcript in Hfq dependent manner. The RNA chaperone Hfq acts to enhance binding of NrrF or stabilizes the NrrF/sdh transcript duplex. Binding of NrrF results in down regulation of the sdhCDAB mRNA transcript results in a Fur-dependent positive regulation of succinate dehydrogenase. Another NrrF RNA target is mRNA petABC, coding for cytochrome bc1 ( an essential components of the N. meningitidis respiratory chain). Interaction between NrrF and the 5′ untranslated region of the petABC mRNA results in its repression.

NrrF appears to be restricted to the Neisseria species and no homologues have yet been identified in other species.

== See also ==
  - RhyB RNA
  - PrrF RNA
  - HrrF RNA
  - Aggregatibacter iron-regulated sRNA
  - Neisseria sigma-E sRNA
  - Neisseria RNA thermometers
  - Neisseria sibling sRNAs NmsR/RcoF
