= Neisseria RNA thermometer =

Lst thermometer
- Predicted secondary structure and sequence conservation of Lst thermometer

Identifiers
- Rfam: RF02810

Other data
- Domain: Bacteria
- GO: GO:0009266,GO:0030371
- SO: SO:005836,SO:0000204
- PDB structures: PDBe

FHbp thermometer
- Predicted secondary structure and sequence conservation of FHbp thermometer

Identifiers
- Rfam: RF02811

Other data
- Domain: Bacteria
- GO: GO:0009266,GO:0030371
- SO: SO:005836,SO:0000204
- PDB structures: PDBe

RNA thermometers (RNATs) regulate gene expression in response to temperature, allowing pathogens such as Neisseria meningitidis to switch on silent genes after entering the host organism. However the temperature for expression of Neisseria virulence-associated traits is 42 °C while other bacterial pathogen RNATs require 37 °C. This is probably because N. meningitidis is an obligate commensal of the human nasopharynx and becomes pathogenic during inflammation due to viral infection. Three independent RNA thermosensors were identified in the 5′UTRs of genes needed for: capsule biosynthesis (cssA), the expression of factor H binding protein (fHbp) and sialylation of lipopolysaccharide, which is essential for bacterial resistance against immune killing (lst). The very different nucleotide sequence and predicted inhibitory structures of the three RNATs indicate that they have evolved independently.

Further study of molecular mechanisms of CssA RNAT showed that it acts as a rheostat that responds to small temperature changes around 37 °C which occur within the upper airways during infection. The increase in temperature opens up the structure to allow increased access to the ribosome binding site. In addition even a small changes in nucleotide composition lead to disregulation of CssA production. These changes distort the structure in a manner that is amplified when the temperature is increased. Hence single nucleotide substitution leads to decrease in activation of the protein and a shift of activation to a higher temperature. This activity could be modulated by pharmacological intervention. The mechanisms underlying thermoregulation of fHbp were also further characterised.

== See also ==
- NrrF RNA
- Neisseria sigma-E sRNA
- Neisseria sibling sRNAs NmsR/RcoF
