= Zinc uptake regulator =

Bacterial gene

Zinc uptake regulation protein
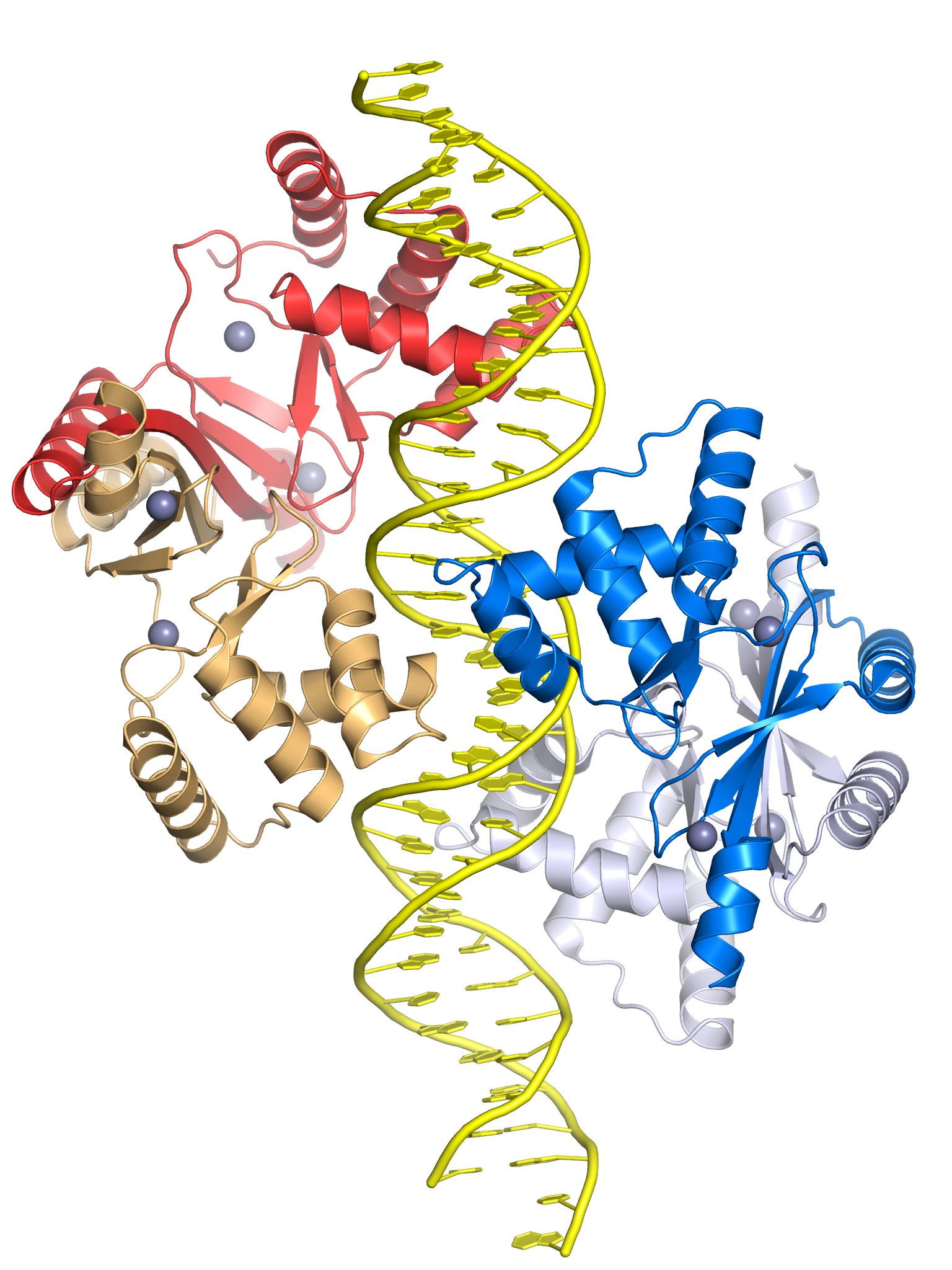
- The E. coli Zur protein in a dimer-of-dimers orientation (blue/light blue and red/orange), interacting with DNA (yellow) and zinc ions (gray spheres). Rendered from PDB: 4MTD.

Identifiers
- Organism: Escherichia coli
- Symbol: Zur
- PDB: 4MTD
- UniProt: P0AC51
Search for
- Structures: Swiss-model
- Domains: InterPro

The zinc uptake regulator (Zur) gene is a bacterial gene that codes for a transcription factor protein involved in zinc homeostasis. The protein is a member of the ferric uptake regulator family and binds zinc with high affinity. It typically functions as a repressor of zinc uptake proteins via binding to characteristic promoter DNA sequences in a dimer-of-dimers arrangement that creates strong cooperativity. Under conditions of zinc deficiency, the protein undergoes a conformational change that prevents DNA binding, thereby lifting the repression and causing zinc uptake genes such as ZinT and the ZnuABC zinc transporter to be expressed.
