= PrrF RNA =

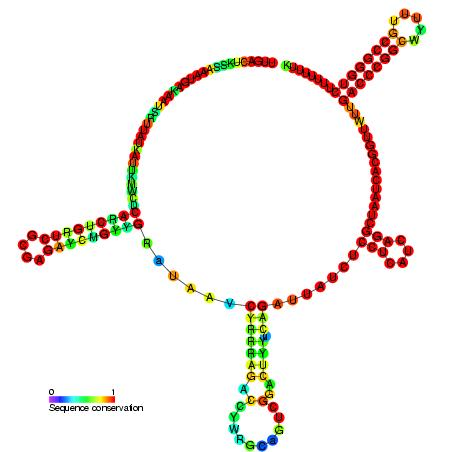
- Predicted secondary structure and sequence conservation of PrrF

Identifiers
- Symbol: PrrF
- Rfam: RF00444

Other data
- RNA type: Gene; sRNA
- Domain(s): Bacteria
- SO: SO:0000655
- PDB structures: PDBe

The PrrF RNAs are small non-coding RNAs involved in iron homeostasis and are encoded by all Pseudomonas species. The PrrF RNAs are analogs of the RyhB RNA, which is encoded by enteric bacteria. Expression of the PrrF RNAs is repressed by the ferric uptake regulator (Fur) when cells are grown in iron-replete conditions. Under iron limitation, the PrrF RNAs are expressed and act to negatively regulate several genes encoding iron-containing proteins, including SodB and succinate dehydrogenase. As such, PrrF regulation "spares" iron when this nutrient becomes scarce.

== PrrF and virulence ==
In Pseudomonas aeruginosa, the PrrF RNAs are required for the production of the Pseudomonas quinolone signal (PQS), a quorum sensing molecule that activates the expression of several virulence genes. The phenomenon is mediated by PrrF repressing the expression of enzymes that degrade anthranilic acid, which is the precursor for PQS synthesis. Due to this regulatory link with PQS, the PrrF RNAs are predicted to play a role in pathogenesis.

The PrrF RNAs of P. aeruginosa are unique from other Pseudomonas species, in that they are encoded by two highly homologous genes, prrF1 and prrF2, which are located in tandem on the chromosome. The tandem arrangement of the prrF genes allows for the expression of a third, heme-regulated non-coding RNA named PrrH, which regulates genes involved in heme homeostasis. Heme is an abundant source of iron in the human host, and P. aeruginosa is the only Pseudomonas species capable of causing infection in humans. Therefore, it is hypothesized that the PrrH RNA plays a role in P. aeruginosa's adaptability as a human pathogen.

Both homologues inhibit translation of antR mRNA, which affects quorum sensing and virulence factor production.

== See also ==
- HrrF RNA
- NrrF RNA
- Aggregatibacter iron-regulated sRNA
