= Cyanobacterial RNA thermometer =

Avashort 5' UTR thermometer
- Predicted secondary structure and sequence conservation of PinT small RNA

Identifiers
- Rfam: RF02699

Other data
- Domain(s): Bacteria
- GO: GO:0009266,GO:0045974
- SO: SO:0005836,SO:0000204
- PDB structures: PDBe

Avalong 5' UTR thermometer
- Predicted secondary structure and sequence conservation of PinT small RNA

Identifiers
- Rfam: RF02698

Other data
- Domain(s): Bacteria
- GO: GO:0009266,GO:0045974
- SO: SO:0005836,SO:0000204
- PDB structures: PDBe

The first cyanobacterial RNA thermometer (RNAT) Hsp17 was found in the 5'UTR of Synechocystis heat shock hsp17 mRNA. Further study demonstrated that cyanobacteria commonly use RNATs to control the translation of their heat shock genes. HspA is a homolog of Hsp17 in thermophilic Thermosynechococcus elongatus. Two more thermometers were found in the 5'UTRs of mesophilic cyanobacteria A. variabilis and Nostoc sp. The first RNAT called avashort was shown to regulate translation by masking the AUG translation start site. The second RNAT called avalong, as it has an extended initial hairpin, might involve tertiary interactions and has similarities to the ROSE element.
