= Intergenic lcrF RNA thermometer =

LcrF intergenic thermometer
- Predicted secondary structure and sequence conservation of LcrF intergenic thermometer

Identifiers
- Rfam: RF02704

Other data
- Domain: Bacteria
- GO: GO:0045975,GO:0009266
- SO: SO:0005836
- PDB structures: PDBe

RNA thermometers regulate gene expression in response to temperature allowing pathogens like Yersinia to switch on silent genes after entering the host organism. Usually, RNA thermometers are located in the 5'UTR, but an intergenic RNA thermometer was found in Yersinia pseudotuberculosis. The LcrF RNA thermometer together with the thermo-labile YmoA protein activates synthesis of the most crucial virulence activator LcrF (VirF). The RNA thermosensor sequence is 100% identical in all human pathogenic Yersinia species.
