= Hsp90 cis-regulatory element =

RNA thermometer in Drosophila

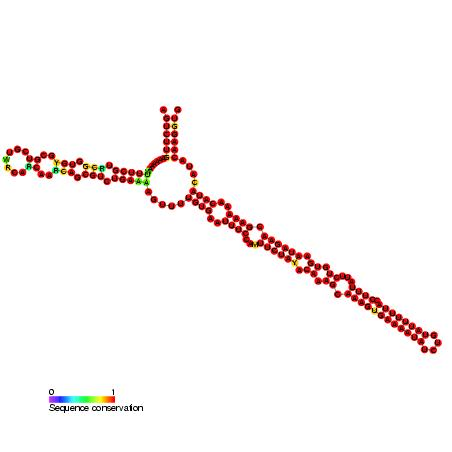
- Predicted secondary structure and sequence conservation of Hsp90_CRE

Identifiers
- Symbol: Hsp90_CRE
- Rfam: RF00433

Other data
- RNA type: Cis-reg; thermoregulator
- Domain(s): Eukaryota
- SO: SO:0000233
- PDB structures: PDBe

The Hsp90 cis regulatory element is an RNA element (RNA thermometer) found in the 5' UTR of the Drosophila hsp90 mRNA. It is required for increased translational efficiency during the heat shock response.

The hsp90 gene product is involved in the Drosophila heat shock response. Translation of the hsp90 mRNA is very inefficient under normal growth temperatures; when heat shock occurs, translation becomes more efficient. This is mediated via this regulatory element.

== See also ==
- ROSE element
- FourU thermometer
