= Neisseria sigma-E sRNA =

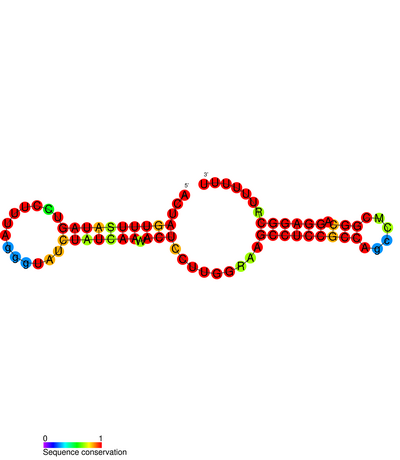
- A representation of the Neisseria sigma-E sRNA secondary structure including a colour scheme that indicates the degree of sequence conservation.

Identifiers
- Symbol: NSE_sRNA
- Rfam: RF02270

Other data
- RNA type: Gene
- Domain: Bacteria;
- PDB structures: PDBe

Neisseria sigma-E sRNA (NSE sRNA) is a non-coding RNA found in the bacterial genus Neisseria, including the two pathogens N. meningitidis and N. gonorrhoeae. The RNA was discovered in a screen for genes differentiated by high expression of the Sigma factor, sigma E. Seven genes were predicted to be regulated by NSE sRNA, including fur, nadC and a putative TetR family transcriptional regulator, through base-pairing interactions with the 5' UTR. The sRNA transcript is terminated by a rho independent terminator.

See also:

- NrrF sRNA
- Neisseria RNA thermometers
- Neisseria sibling sRNAs NmsR/RcoF
