= PrfA thermoregulator UTR =

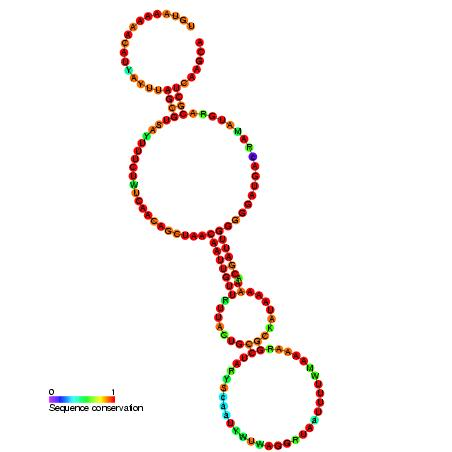
- Predicted secondary structure and sequence conservation of PrfA

Identifiers
- Symbol: PrfA
- Rfam: RF00038

Other data
- RNA type: Cis-reg; thermoregulator
- Domain: Bacteria
- SO: SO:0000233
- PDB structures: PDBe

The PrfA thermoregulator UTR is an RNA thermometer found in the 5' UTR of the prfA gene. In Listeria monocytogenes, virulence genes are maximally expressed at 37 °C (human body temperature) but are almost silent at 30 °C. The genes are controlled by PrfA, a transcriptional activator whose expression is thermoregulated. It has been shown that the untranslated mRNA (UTR) preceding prfA, forms a secondary structure, which masks the ribosome binding region. It is thought that at 37 °C, the hairpin structure 'melts' and the SD sequence is unmasked.
