= Ferric uptake regulator family =

FUR
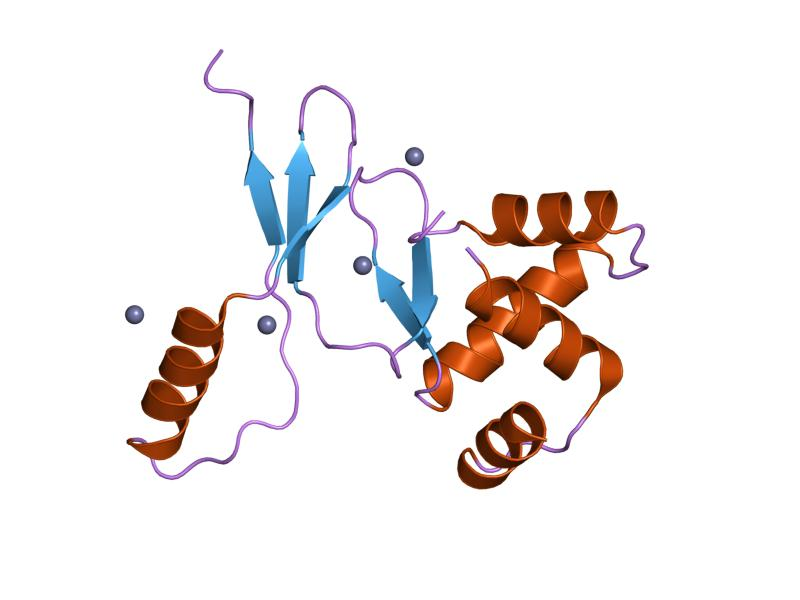
- ferric uptake regulator

Identifiers
- Symbol: FUR
- Pfam: PF01475
- Pfam clan: CL0123
- InterPro: IPR002481
- SCOP2: 1mzb / SCOPe / SUPFAM
Available protein structures:
- Pfam: structures / ECOD
- PDB: RCSB PDB; PDBe; PDBj
- PDBsum: structure summary

Ferric uptake regulatory protein

Identifiers
- Organism: Escherichia coli
- Symbol: Fur
- PDB: 2FU4
- UniProt: P0A9A9
Search for
- Structures: Swiss-model
- Domains: InterPro

In molecular biology, the ferric uptake regulator family is a family of bacterial proteins involved in regulating metal ion uptake and in metal homeostasis. The family is named for its founding member, known as the ferric uptake regulator or ferric uptake regulatory protein (Fur). Fur proteins are responsible for controlling the intracellular concentration of iron in many bacteria. Iron is essential for most organisms, but its concentration must be carefully managed over a wide range of environmental conditions; high concentrations can be toxic due to the formation of reactive oxygen species.

== Function ==
Members of the ferric uptake regulator family are transcription factors that primarily exert their regulatory effects as repressors: when bound to their cognate metal ion, they are capable of binding DNA and preventing expression of the genes they regulate, but under low concentrations of metal, they undergo a conformational change that prevents DNA binding and lifts the repression. In the case of the ferric uptake regulator protein itself, its immediate downstream target is a noncoding RNA called RyhB.

The Ferric Uptake Regulator protein functions in Gram-negative and Gram-positive bacteria. Ferric uptake regulators act by sensing changes in free iron, so upon activation, they regulate target genes through interactions with the promoter region, known as the "Fur box". The magnetospirillum gryphiswaldense MSR-1 Fur is a key regulatory protein involved in maintaining iron homeostasis. This Fur is similar to the E. coli Fur, which acts by binding to Fur boxes to regulate gene expression as a way to maintain iron levels. Additionally, it serves as a model and foundation for other regulators that are able to sense changes in iron, zinc, and magnesium.

In the image of the binding sites of magnetospirillum gryphiswaldense, the cyan color reflects the glutamate residues, while the magenta represents the histidine residues. These residues interact with the manganese ion to create binding site 1 in the ferric uptake regulator protein.

In addition to the ferric uptake regulator protein, members of the Fur family are also involved in maintaining homeostasis with respect to other ions:

- Mur, responsive to manganese.
- Nur, responsive to nickel.
- PerR, responsive to peroxide; PerR monomers contain two binding sites and occur in zinc/iron and zinc/manganese forms.
- Zur, responsive to zinc; Zur regulates uptake and transport through a regulon involving ZinT and the transporter ZnuABC.
- Irr, responsive to iron through the status of heme biosynthesis. Has both activator and repressor function. Prevalent in Rhizobium, Bradyrhizobium and many other alphaproteobacteria.

The iron dependent repressor family is a functionally similar but non-homologous family of proteins involved in iron homeostasis in prokaryotes.

== Relationship to virulence ==
Metal homeostasis can be a factor in bacterial virulence, an observation with a particularly long history in the case of iron. In some cases, expression of virulence factors is under the regulatory control of the Fur protein.
