= Transterm =

Transterm is a database of mRNA sequences, codon usage, and associated cis-regulatory elements that regulate gene expression. Many of these elements are in the 3' UTR. Transterm is a database provided by the Biochemistry department of The University of Otago. Transterm is used to look at the protein binding sites within mRNA. Transterm is continually updated based upon results in peer-reviewed journals.
