= Neisseria sibling sRNAs NmsR/RcoF =

NmsR_{A} and NmsR_{B} (Neisseria metabolic switch regulator), RcoF1 and RcoF2 (RNA regulating colonization factor) as well as NgncR_162 and NgncR_163 (Neisseria gonorrhoeae non-coding RNA) are all names of neisserial sibling small regulatory RNAs described and independently named in three publications. NmsR_{B}/RcoF1/NgncR_163 was shown to be the predominant sibling. The sRNAs are tandemly arranged, structurally nearly identical and share 70% sequence identity. They translationally down-regulate genes involved in basic metabolic processes including tricarboxylic acid cycle enzymes and amino acid uptake and degradation. The target genes include: fumC, sdhC, gltA, sucC, prpB and prpC. The expression of the sRNAs is presumably under the control of RelA, as shown for N. meningitidis. Furthermore, the sRNAs interact with Hfq protein and target repression of putative colonization factor of the human nasopharynx PrpB mRNA, hence one of the proposed names is RNA regulating colonization factor.

== See also ==
- NrrF RNA
- Neisseria sigma-E sRNA
- Neisseria RNA thermometers
