= Lig RNA thermometer =

Non-coding RNA in Leptospira interrogans

- Predicted secondary structure and sequence conservation of Lig thermometer

Identifiers
- Rfam: RF02815

Other data
- Domain(s): Bacteria
- GO: GO:0009266,GO:0030371
- SO: SO:005836,SO:0000204
- PDB structures: PDBe

Lig RNA thermometer is a cis-acting non-coding RNA element that controls ligA and ligB gene expression in Leptospira interrogans in response to temperature change. The lipoproteins LigA and LigB stimulate adhesion of the element and then hosting proteins. The RNA that composes of 175-nucleotide 5'UTR and the first six lig codons (identical in ligA and ligB) folds into two distinct-stem loop structures. Lig expression is limited by these double-stranded RNA structures because they occludes the ribosome-binding site. At higher temperatures, the ribosome binding site is exposed to promote translation initiation.
