= Household & Commercial Products Association =

The Household & Commercial Products Association (HCPA), formerly known as the Consumer Specialty Products Association (CSPA), is an industry trade association for chemical products companies, based in Washington, D.C.

== History ==
The association was founded in 1914 under the name Insecticides Manufacturers Association as a direct response to the enactment of the Federal Insecticide Act of 1910. The group later expanded its membership to include disinfectant manufacturers and renamed it the Insecticides and Disinfectants Manufacturers Association (IDMA).

In 1932, the association established its first permanent office in New York City and later eventually changed the name to Chemical Specialties Manufacturers Association, Inc. (CSMA) to more accurately represent the more diverse membership. By 1974, to have a more direct impact on federal legislation, CSMA moved to Washington, D.C. The association was very involved in the industry's responses to the creation and growth of the U.S. Environmental Protection Agency and the Risk Retention Act of 1986. By the turn of the century, the association again changed names to the Consumer Specialty Products Association (CSPA) with seven distinct divisions: Aerosol, Air Care, Cleaners, Polishes, Automotive Care, Antimicrobial, and Pest Management.

Today, under the leadership of Steve Caldeira, the former President & CEO of the International Franchise Association, CSPA rebranded to more accurately represent its membership and now is recognized as the Household & Commercial Products Association (HCPA).
