= ZnuABC =

Class of transport proteins

High-affinity zinc uptake system protein ZnuA
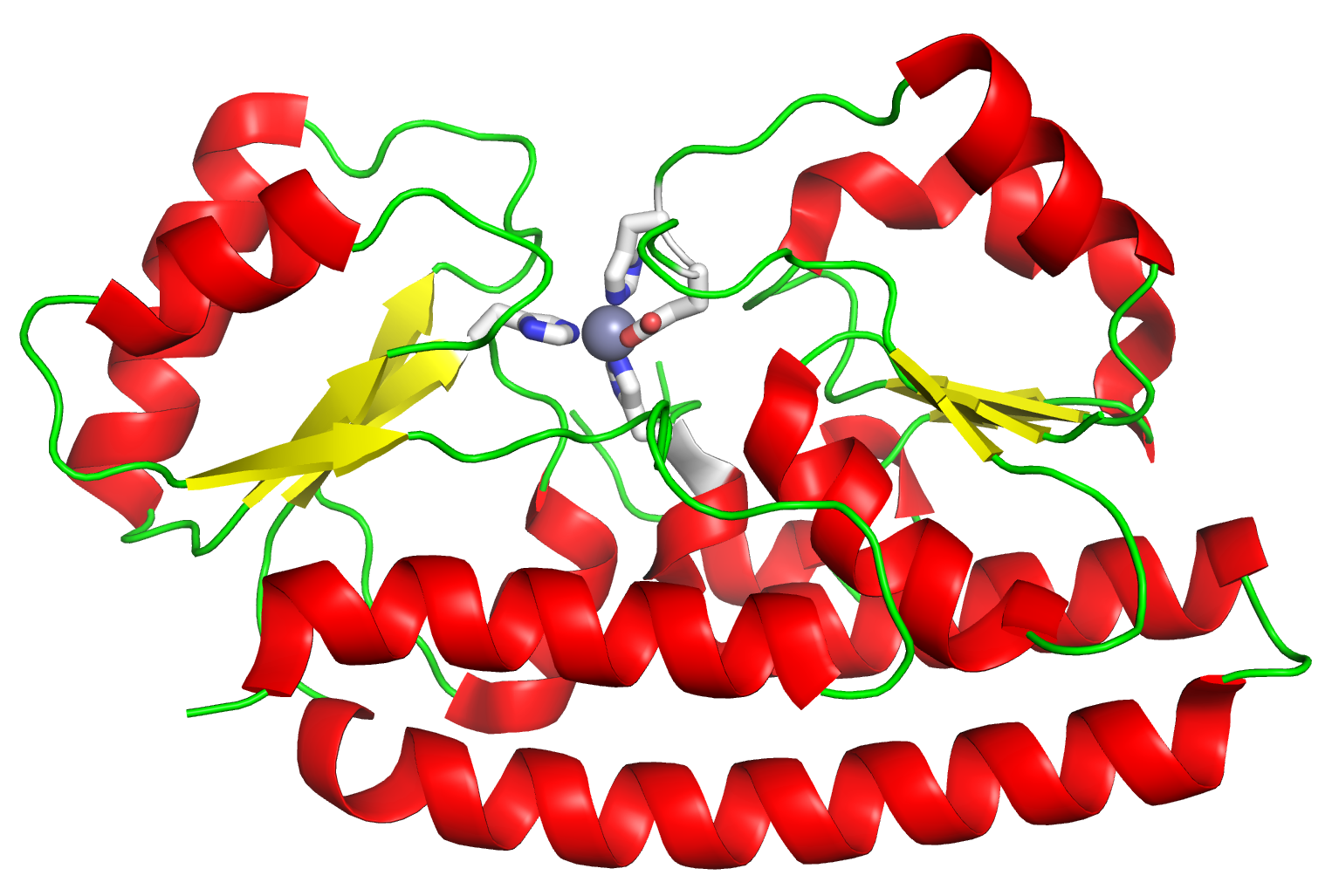
- The structure of ZnuA bound to zinc (gray sphere), with coordinating amino acids shown in white. From PDB: 2OSV.

Identifiers
- Organism: Escherichia coli
- Symbol: ZnuA
- Orthologs: OMA: entry
- PDB: 2OSV
- UniProt: P39172
Search for
- Structures: Swiss-model
- Domains: InterPro

High-affinity zinc uptake system membrane protein ZnuB

Identifiers
- Organism: Escherichia coli
- Symbol: ZnuB
- Orthologs: OMA: entry
- UniProt: P39832
Search for
- Structures: Swiss-model
- Domains: InterPro

High-affinity zinc uptake system membrane protein ZnuC

Identifiers
- Organism: Escherichia coli
- Symbol: ZnuC
- Orthologs: OMA: entry
- UniProt: P0A9X1
Search for
- Structures: Swiss-model
- Domains: InterPro

ZnuABC is a high-affinity transporter specialized for transporting zinc ions as part of a system for metal ion homeostasis in bacteria. The complex is a member of the ATP-binding cassette (ABC) transporter protein family. The transporter contains three protein components:

- ZnuA, a periplasmic zinc-binding protein.
- ZnuB, an integral membrane protein that transports zinc across the cytoplasmic membrane.
- ZnuC, an ATPase responsible for coupling ion transport to ATP hydrolysis.

The expression of ZnuABC is regulated by the zinc uptake regulator (Zur) protein and is induced by conditions of zinc starvation. Because zinc is often a limiting factor in bacterial infections, some pathogenic bacteria are heavily dependent on ZnuABC to scavenge zinc from the environment in an animal host.

The periplasmic protein ZnuA interacts with ZinT, another component of the regulon controlled by Zur, which is also involved in periplasmic zinc homeostasis.
