= ZinT protein domain =

Family of protein domains found in prokaryotes

ZinT
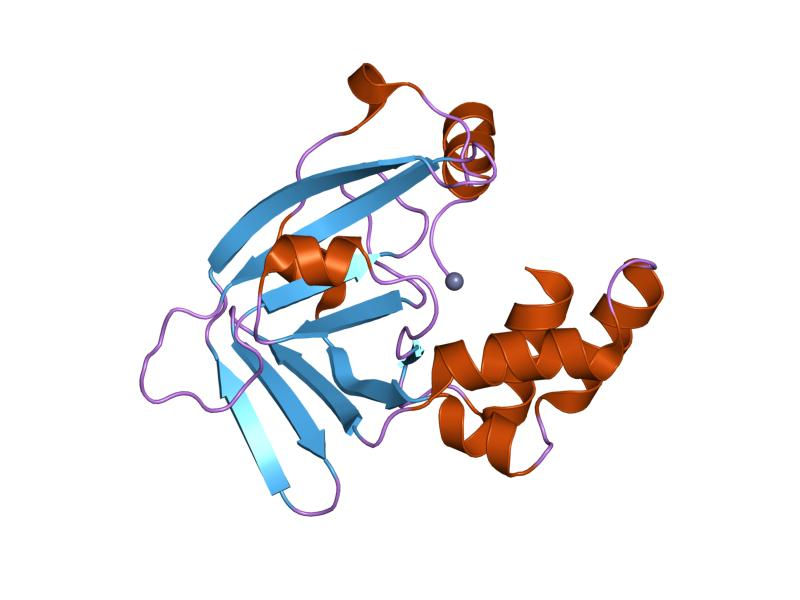
- Crystal structure of metal-binding protein YodA from E. coli, PFAM DUF149

Identifiers
- Symbol: ZinT
- Pfam: PF09223
- Pfam clan: CL0116
- InterPro: IPR015304
- SCOP2: 1oej / SCOPe / SUPFAM
Available protein structures:
- Pfam: structures / ECOD
- PDB: RCSB PDB; PDBe; PDBj
- PDBsum: structure summary

In molecular biology, ZinT (formerly known as YodA) is a family of protein domains found in prokaryotes. The domain contains a single binding site that can accommodate a divalent cation, with a geometry suggestive of zinc binding. This family was first thought to be part of the bacterial response to a toxic heavy metal cadmium by binding to the metal to ensure its elimination; however, more recent work has suggested a role in zinc homeostasis.

== Function ==
There is strong evidence for involvement of the ZinT domain in zinc homeostasis and management of zinc in the periplasm. It may also facilitate zinc uptake from the environment through interactions with the znuABC zinc transporter. It is regulated by the metalloregulator gene Zur (zinc uptake regulator).

The domain was originally discovered in the bacterial stress response to cadmium. Further studies have found that it binds to cadmium, zinc, nickel, and mercury, but not other common metals such as cobalt, copper, iron, and manganese. It may have a secondary function in managing heavy-metal toxicity.
