= Iron dependent repressor =

Iron dependent repressor, N-terminal DNA binding domain (dtxR-type HTH domain)
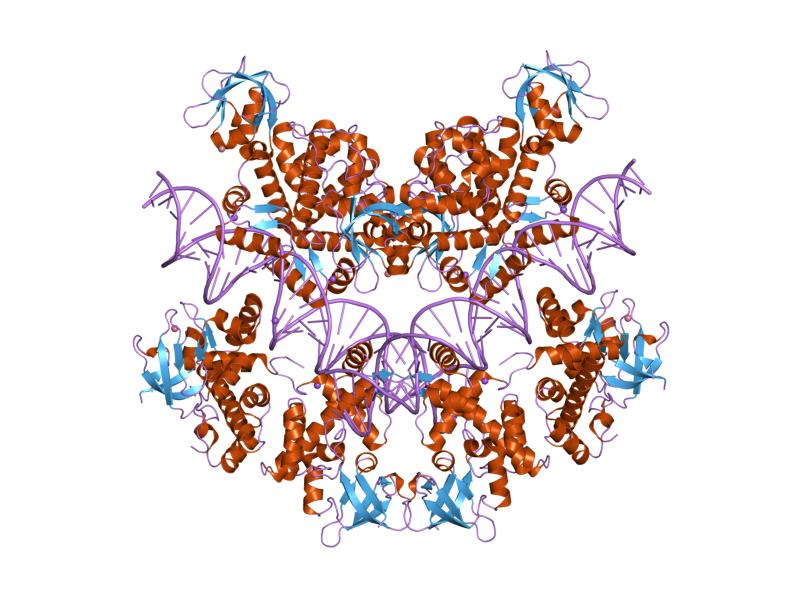
- crystal structure of an ider-dna complex reveals a conformational change in activated ider for base-specific interactions

Identifiers
- Symbol: Fe_dep_repress
- Pfam: PF01325
- Pfam clan: CL0123
- InterPro: IPR022687
- SCOP2: 2dtr / SCOPe / SUPFAM
Available protein structures:
- PDB: IPR022687 PF01325 (ECOD; PDBsum)
- AlphaFold: IPR022687; PF01325

Iron dependent repressor, metal binding and dimerisation domain
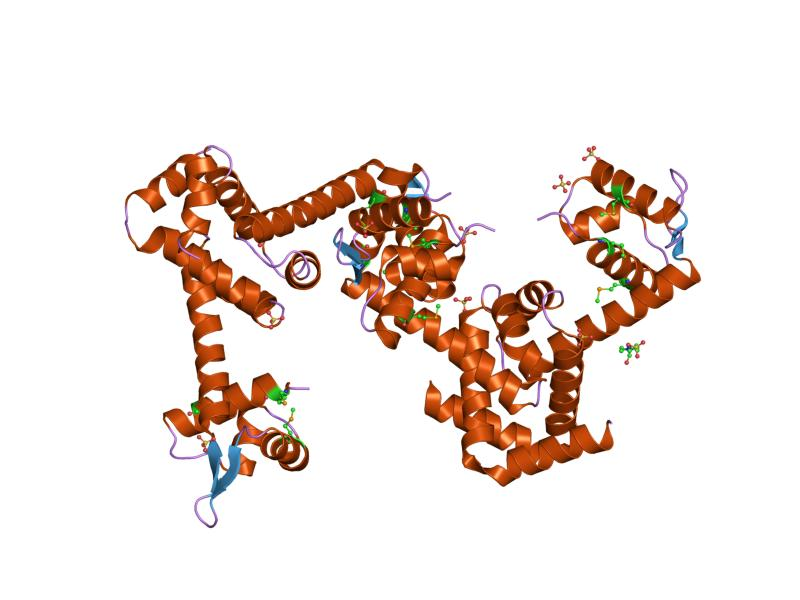
- the structure of apo-mntr from bacillus subtilis, selenomethionine derivative

Identifiers
- Symbol: Fe_dep_repr_C
- Pfam: PF02742
- Pfam clan: CL0123
- InterPro: IPR001367
- SCOP2: 2dtr / SCOPe / SUPFAM
Available protein structures:
- PDB: IPR001367 PF02742 (ECOD; PDBsum)
- AlphaFold: IPR001367; PF02742

In molecular biology, the iron dependent repressors are a family of bacterial and archaeal transcriptional repressors.

At their N-terminus they contain a dtxR-type HTH domain. This is a DNA-binding, winged helix-turn-helix (wHTH) domain of about 65 amino acids present in metalloregulators of the dtxR/mntR family. The domain is named after Corynebacterium diphtheriae dtxR, an iron-specific diphtheria toxin repressor, and Bacillus subtilis mntR, a manganese transport regulator. Iron-responsive metalloregulators such as dtxR and ideR occur in Gram-positive bacteria of the high GC branch, while manganese-responsive metalloregulators like mntR are described in diverse genera of Gram-positive and Gram-negative bacteria and also in Archaea. The metalloregulators like dtxR/mntR contain the DNA-binding dtxR-type HTHdomain usually in the N-terminal part. The C-terminal part contains a dimerisation domain with two metal-binding sites, although the primary metal-binding site is less conserved in the Mn(II)-regulators. Fe(II)-regulated proteins contain an SH3-like domain as a C-terminal extension, which is absent in Mn(II)-regulated mntR.

Metal-ion dependent regulators orchestrate the virulence of several important human pathogens. The dtxR protein regulates the expression of diphtheria toxin in response to environmental iron concentrations. Furthermore, dtxR and ideR control iron uptake. Homeostasis of manganese, which is an essential nutrient, is regulated by mntR. A typical dtxR-type metalloregulator binds two divalent metal effectors per monomer, upon which allosteric changes occur that moderate binding to the cognate DNA operators. Iron-bound dtxR homodimers bind to an interrupted palindrome of 19 bp, protecting a sequence of ~30 bp. The crystal structures of iron-regulated and manganese-regulated repressors show that the DNA binding domain contains three alpha-helices and a pair of antiparallel beta-strands. Helices 2 and 3 comprise the helix-turn-helix motif and the beta-strands are called the wing. This wHTH topology is similar to the lysR-type HTH. Most dtxR-type metalloregulators bind as dimers to the DNA major groove.

Several proteins are known to contain a dtxR-type HTH domain. These include: Corynebacterium diphtheriae dtxR, a diphtheria toxin repressor, which regulates the expression of the high-affinity iron uptake system, other iron-sensitive genes, and the bacteriophage tox gene. Metal-bound dtxR represses transcription by binding the tox operator; if iron is limiting, conformational changes of the wHTH disrupt DNA-binding and the diphtheria toxin is produced. Mycobacterium tuberculosis ideR, an iron-dependent regulator that is essential for this pathogen. The regulator represses genes for iron acquisition and activates iron storage genes, and is a positive regulator of oxidative stress responses. Bacillus subtilis mntR, a manganese transport regulator, binds Mn2+ as an effector and is a transcriptional repressor of transporters for the import of manganese. Treponema pallidum troR, a metal-dependent transcriptional repressor. Archaeoglobus fulgidus MDR1 (troR), a metal-dependent transcriptional repressor, which negatively regulates its own transcription.
