= Repression of heat shock gene expression (ROSE) element =

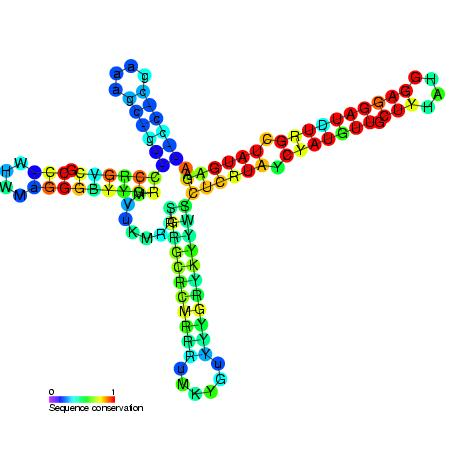
- Predicted secondary structure and sequence conservation of ROSE

Identifiers
- Symbol: ROSE
- Rfam: RF00435

Other data
- RNA type: Cis-reg; thermoregulator
- Domain: Bacteria
- SO: SO:0000204
- PDB structures: PDBe

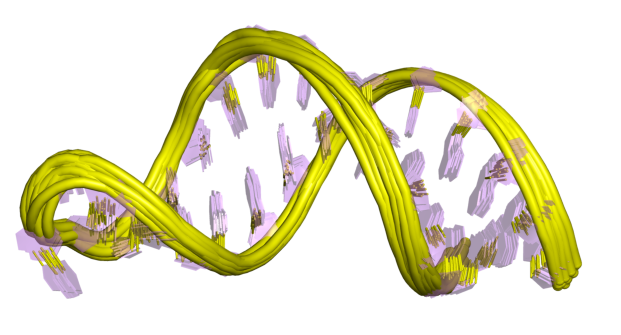
A representation of the 3D structure of the microROSE RNA. This derived from a solution NMR structure of the microROSE element.

The repression of heat shock gene expression (ROSE) element is an RNA element found in the 5' UTR of some heat shock protein's mRNAs. The ROSE element is an RNA thermometer that negatively regulates heat shock gene expression. The secondary structure is thought to be altered by temperature, thus it is an RNA thermometer. This structure blocks access to the ribosome binding site at normal temperatures. During heat shock however, the structure changes freeing the ribosome binding site and allowing expression to occur.

A partial structure of this RNA element has been determined using NMR.

== ROSE_{1} and ROSE_{AT2} ==
ROSE_{1} and ROSE_{AT2} are specific examples of ROSE elements. ROSE_{1} is found in Bradyrhizobium japonicum whereas ROSE_{AT2} is a closely related element from Agrobacterium tumefaciens. The two RNA elements have similar secondary structures with ROSE_{1} having an extra hairpin. All ROSE elements contain a characteristic 'bulged G' opposite the Shine-Dalgarno sequence binding site, without this nucleotide the RNA thermometer loses its temperature-sensitivity.

== IpbA ==
Expression of the heat shock protein IpbA in species of Pseudomonas is controlled by a ROSE-type RNA thermometer. This thermometer only consists of two hairpins. It inhibits translation of IpbA at low temperatures and permits translation when temperature increases.

== rhlA and lsdI ROSE-like elements ==
Pseudomonas aeruginosa quorum sensing-dependent virulence factors can be thermoregulated. ROSE thermometer present in the 5'UTR of rhlA and ROSE-like thermometer in the 5'UTR of lasI block the translation at lower temperatures.

== See also ==
- Cyanobacterial RNA thermometer
- FourU thermometer
- Hsp90 cis-regulatory element
