= Trans-acting =

In the field of molecular biology, trans-acting (trans-regulatory, trans-regulation), in general, means "acting from a different molecule" (i.e., intermolecular). It may be considered the opposite of cis-acting (cis-regulatory, cis-regulation), which, in general, means "acting from the same molecule" (i.e., intramolecular).

In the context of transcription regulation, a trans-acting factor is usually a regulatory protein that binds to DNA. The binding of a trans-acting factor to a cis-regulatory element in DNA can cause changes in transcriptional expression levels. microRNAs or other diffusible molecules are also examples of trans-acting factors that can regulate target sequences. The trans-acting gene may be on a different chromosome to the target gene, but the activity is via the intermediary protein or RNA that it encodes. Cis-acting elements, on the other hand, do not code for protein or RNA. Both the trans-acting gene and the protein/RNA that it encodes are said to "act in trans" on the target gene.

Transcription factors are categorized as trans-acting factors.

== See also ==
- Trans-regulatory element
- Transactivation
- Transrepression
