= Cas1 =

Protein used in CRISPR

CRISPR-associated protein 1
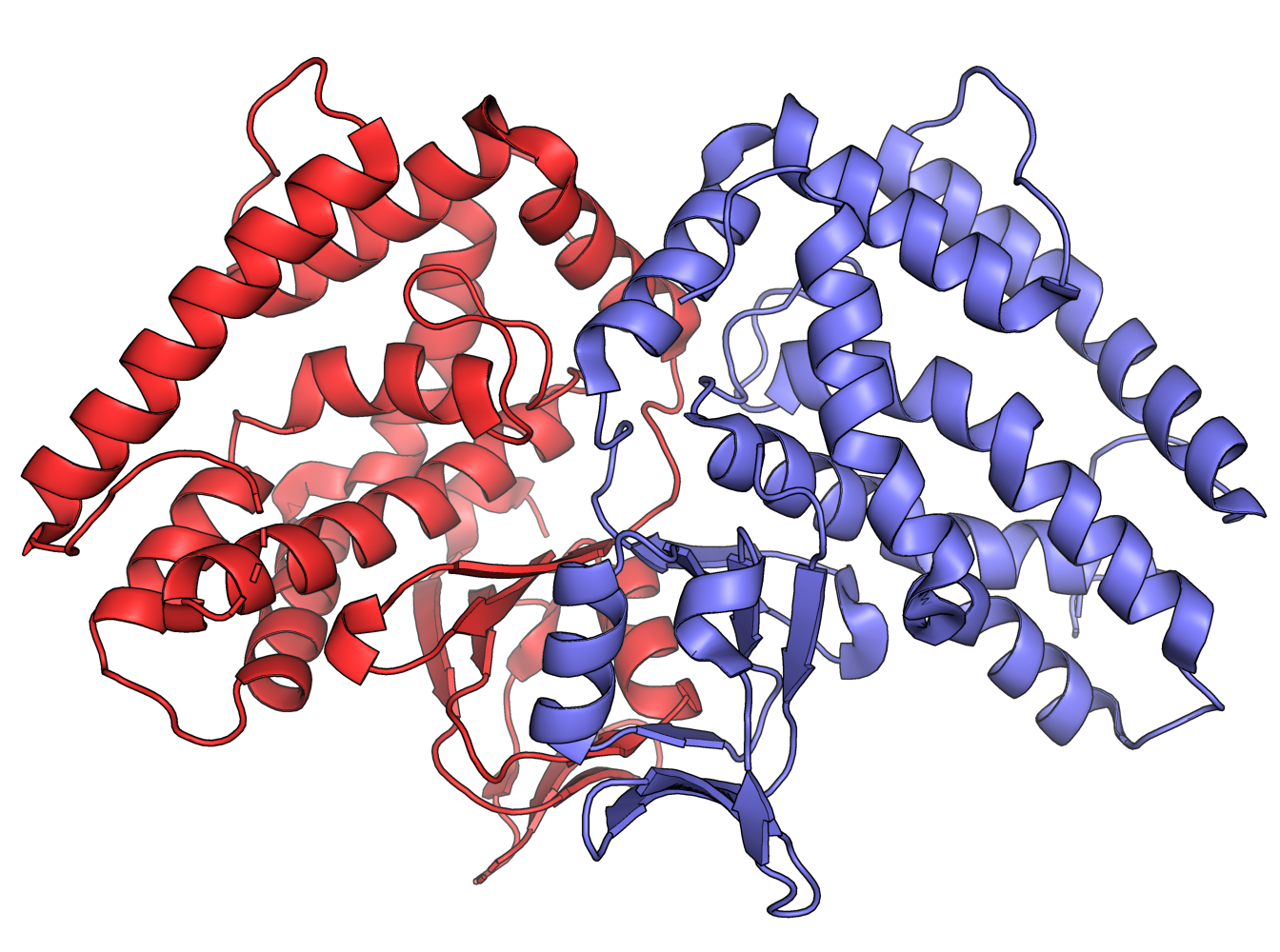
- Escherichia coli CRISPR associated protein Cas1. PDB: 3NKD

Identifiers
- Symbol: cas1
- Pfam: PF01867
- InterPro: IPR002729
Available protein structures:
- PDB: IPR002729 PF01867 (ECOD; PDBsum)
- AlphaFold: IPR002729; PF01867

CRISPR-associated protein 1 (cas1) is one of the two universally conserved proteins found in the CRISPR prokaryotic immune defense system. Cas1 is a metal-dependent DNA-specific endonuclease that produces double-stranded DNA fragments. Cas1 forms a stable complex with the other universally conserved CRISPR-associated protein, cas2, which is essential to spacer acquisition for CRISPR systems.

In July 2017, researchers led by Jennifer Doudna from the University of California at Berkeley, in Berkeley, California, using electron microscopy and X-ray crystallography, at the Advanced Light Source at Lawrence Berkeley National Laboratory, the Stanford Linear Accelerator Center, and the HHMI electron microscope facility at UC Berkeley, discovered how Cas1-Cas2, the proteins responsible for the ability of the CRISPR immune system (CRISPR means: clustered regularly interspaced short palindromic repeats) in bacteria to adapt to new viral infections, identify the site in the genome where they insert viral DNA so they can recognize it later and mount an attack. A protein called IHF plays a crucial role in this process. Scientists also discovered that Cas-1 inhibits Cas-2/3 enzymatic activity as a nuclease and in the same discussion postulated that Cas1-Cas2 had an evolutionary origin as a toxin-antitoxin complex. This could result in a change in the evolutionary model of the Cas1-Cas2 complex.
