= FourU thermometer =

Class of non-coding RNAs in Salmonella

FourU
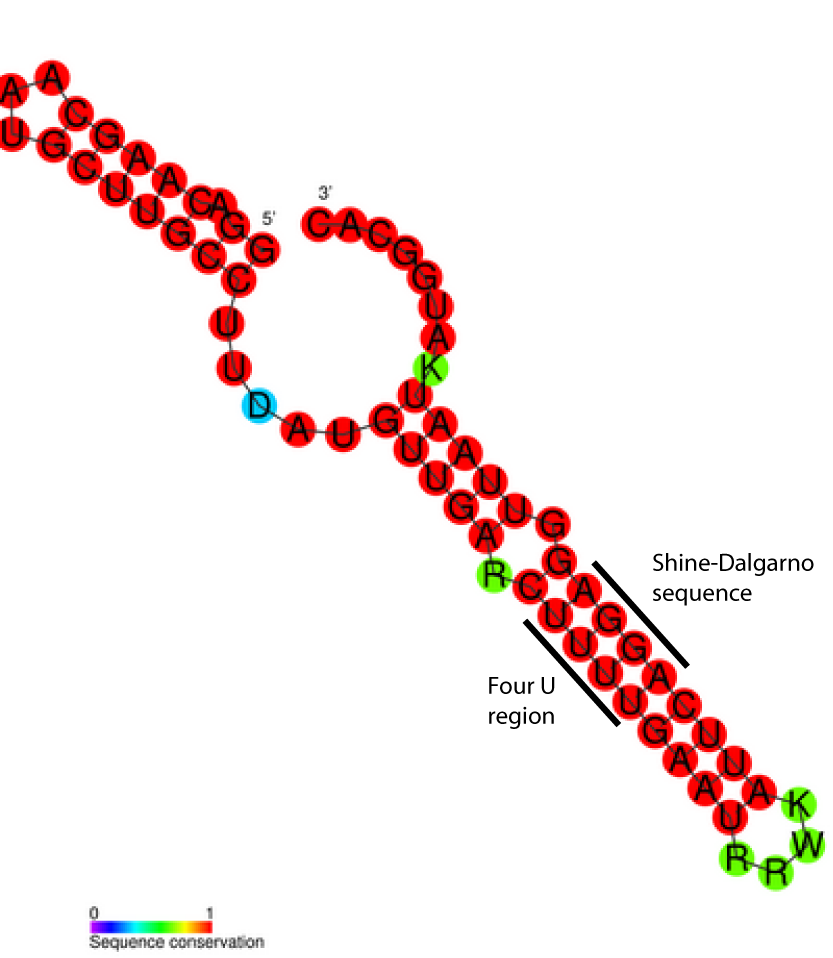
- Consensus secondary structure of FourU RNA thermometers. Red colouring indicates the highest levels of nucleotide conservation.

Identifiers
- Symbol: FourU
- Rfam: RF01795

Other data
- RNA type: RNA thermometer
- Domain: Salmonella;
- PDB structures: PDBe

FourU thermometers are a class of non-coding RNA thermometers found in Salmonella. They are named 'FourU' due to the four highly conserved uridine nucleotides found directly opposite the Shine-Dalgarno sequence on hairpin II (pictured). RNA thermometers such as FourU control regulation of temperature via heat shock proteins in multiple prokaryotes. FourU thermometers are relatively small RNA molecules, only 57 nucleotides in length, and have a simple two-hairpin structure.

FourU are found in the 5' untranslated region of the gene for heat shock protein Salmonella agsA, they repress translation of this protein by base-pairing the Shine-Dalgarno sequence of the gene's mRNA. This prevents ribosomes from binding the start codon of the gene.

They are also found in the 5'UTR of htrA (high temperature requirement) genes in Salmonella and E.coli.

In V. cholerae fourU thermometer in the 5' of toxT controls its temperature-dependent translation. At human body temperature, the thermometer structure opens and to allow transcriptional activator protein ToxT translation, facilitating V. cholerae virulence.

Other known RNA thermometers include the ROSE element and Hsp90 cis-reg element.

== Response to temperature ==
Hairpin II appears to be a dynamic feature of FourU's secondary structure. It undergoes a conformational shift when exposed to temperatures above 45 °C, becoming increasingly unpaired as temperature rises. Hairpin I, in contrast, remains stably base-paired in temperatures as high as 50 °C, which implies the structural shift of hairpin II from closed to open may have an important role in heat shock response. A later study used mutant analysis and calculations of enthalpy and entropy to support a cooperative zipper-type unfolding mechanism of FourU hairpin II in response to temperature increase.

== Sigma factor cooperation ==
Like other RNA thermometers, FourU is not solely responsible for temperature-dependent expression of its adjacent gene. Instead, it operates in conjunction with a sigma factor (σ^{32}) which is known to also regulate a number of other genes. Sigma factor-RNA thermometer combinations have been found to regulate other heat-shock genes (such as ibpA in E. coli) which has led to speculation of undiscovered RNA thermometers operating alongside sigma factor modules to regulate other related genes as an additional level of control. Further speculation suggests the simpler RNA thermometer method of gene regulation may have evolved prior to the more complex sigma factor transcription control.

== agsA function ==
The agsA gene, which is regulated by FourU thermometers, was first discovered in Salmonella enterica. The protein coded for by this gene is a small heat shock protein (sHSP) which protects bacteria from irreversible aggregation of proteins and aids in their refolding. Mutant analysis confirmed the importance of agsA: a plasmid containing the gene and a promoter increased the survival rate of a thermosensitive mutant phenotype by remedying protein aggregation at high temperatures. It has a similar function to the human chaperone α-crystallin.

== See also ==
- ROSE element
- Hsp90
- Hsp70
