= RpoS mRNA 5′UTR =

rpoS mRNA encodes for the rpoS stress factor, sigma S (σ^{S} or σ^{38}) in Escherichia coli and related bacteria, where DsrA in conjunction with the Sm like RNA binding protein, Hfq promote the translation of this rpoS mRNA. The 5′ UTR of the rpoS mRNA forms a self-inhibitory stem loop that shields the shine-dalgarno sequence and therefore inhibits translation. The secondary structure of the 5′UTR was predicted by acetylation of ribose 2′-hydroxyls with NMIA and by using a secondary structure prediction program, RNAstructure. DsrA stimulates rpoS translation by binding in the 5′UTR and causes the stem loop to open, exposing the ribosome binding site.

Site-directed mutagenesis and deletion analysis located an AAYAA motif identified upstream of the stem loop structure which is required for Hfq binding. Comparative genomics has shown that this regulatory secondary structure is conserved across several gram-negative bacteria species.
