= Cas2 =

Protein used in CRISPR

CRISPR-associated protein 2
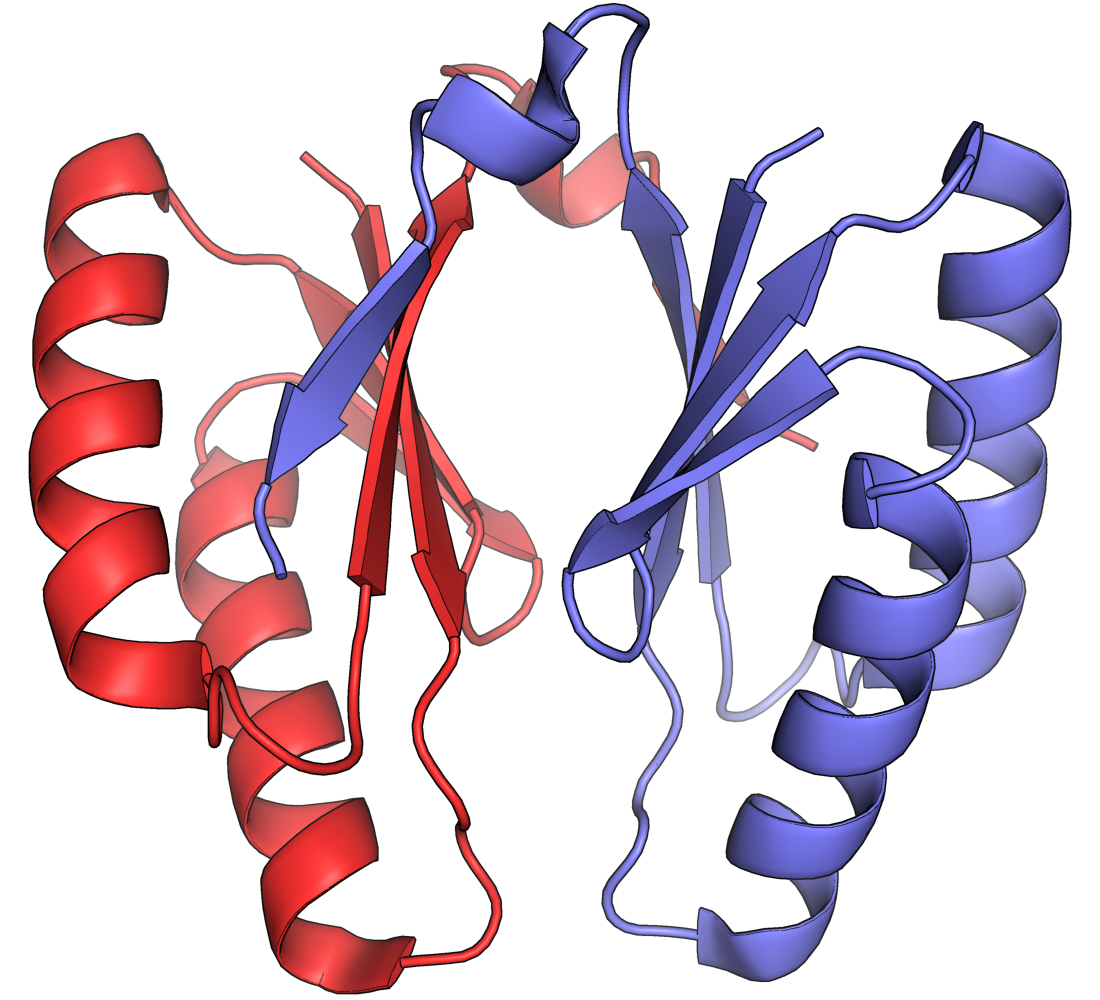
- Streptococcus pyogenes Cas2. PDB: 4QR2

Identifiers
- Symbol: cas2
- Pfam: PF09827
- InterPro: IPR019199
Available protein structures:
- PDB: IPR019199 PF09827 (ECOD; PDBsum)
- AlphaFold: IPR019199; PF09827

Cas2 is a protein associated with CRISPR that is involved with spacer acquisition. Representative cas2 proteins have been characterized as endonucleases that cleave single-stranded RNAs preferentially within U-rich regions, or as metal-dependent endonucleases targeting double-stranded (ds)DNA
