= Surveyor nuclease assay =

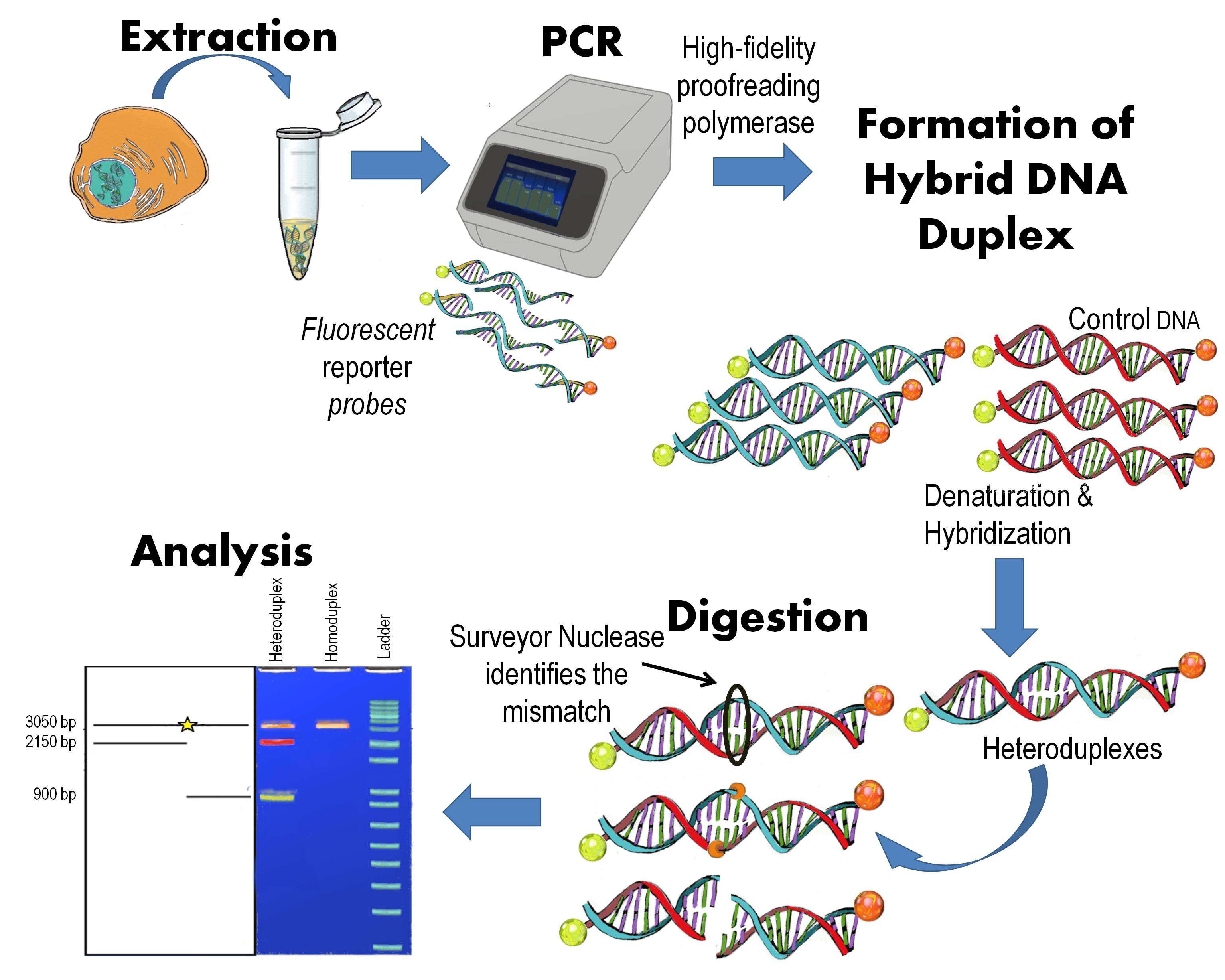
Diagram of the surveyor nuclease assay workflow

Surveyor nuclease assay is an enzyme mismatch cleavage assay used to detect single base mismatches or small insertions or deletions (indels).

Surveyor nuclease is part of a family of mismatch-specific endonucleases that were discovered in celery (CEL nucleases). The enzyme recognizes all base substitutions and insertions/deletions, and cleaves the 3′ side of mismatched sites in both DNA strands with high specificity

This assay has been used to identify and analyze mutations in a variety of organisms and cell types, as well as to confirm genome modifications following genome editing (using CRISPR/TALENs/zinc fingers).

== Background ==
The ability to discover and detect known and unknown mutations is of great importance in biomedical research and genetic diagnosis (see Applications). Therefore, multiple methods have been developed to enable research-based and clinical diagnostic detection of such mutations.

The most direct manner to identify the sequence changes/differences is through reading the DNA sequence with traditional and high throughput DNA sequencing methods (see Sanger sequencing and DNA sequencing). However, these methods provide large amounts of unnecessary data and are costly to use. In addition, traditional sequencing can be useful for detection of germline mutations, but may be less successful in detecting somatic minor alleles at low frequencies (mosaicism). Therefore, other non-sequencing based approaches to detect the mutation or polymorphisms are required.

Other widely used methods depend on physical properties of DNA, for example melting temperature-based systems such as Single-stranded conformational polymorphism analysis (SSCP) and Denaturing high-performance liquid chromatography (DHPLC). These techniques are generally limited to the analysis of short DNA fragments (< 1000 bp) and are only able to indicate the presence of polymorphism(s), but do not easily yield the location of a mutation within a DNA sequence. Therefore, this must be followed with additional techniques in order to pinpoint the mutation or map multiple mutations in the same fragment.

Enzymatic mismatch cleavage assays exploit the properties of mismatch-specific endonucleases to detect and cleave mismatches. These methods are simple to run using standard laboratory techniques and equipment, and can detect polymorphisms, single base pair mismatches, and insertions and deletions at low frequencies. Several such enzymes have been discovered (including CEL I, T4 endonuclease VII, Endonuclease V, T7 endonuclease I).

One of the commonly used enzymes is Surveyor nuclease (CEL II), which cleaves the 3′ side of both DNA strands with high specificity at sites of base substitution or insertion/deletion. This enzyme is capable of cleaving at multiple mutations in large DNA fragments, and produces detectable cleavage products from mismatch DNA representing only a small proportion of the DNA in a population, thus making it suitable for use in enzyme mismatch cleavage assays.

== History ==
In 1998, Olekowski et al. identified a new mismatch specific endonuclease. The enzyme was purified from celery and was given the name CEL I.

CEL I was shown to cut DNA with high specificity on both strands at the 3′ side of base-substitution mismatches, and can therefore be used in enzyme mutation detection methods to identify mutations and polymorphisms. Olekowski and colleagues demonstrated this technique by using this enzyme to detect a variety of mutations and polymorphisms in the human BRCA1 gene.

While monitoring the purification of CEL I using polyacrylamide gel electrophoresis, Yang et al. noticed that there were two nuclease bands that stayed together during all the purification steps. The major nuclease activity was designated CEL I, while the minor activity on SDS-PAGE was named CEL II. They concluded that CEL I and CEL II are similar, and that both are able to cleave a DNA mismatch.

In 2004, Qiu et al. developed a mutation detection technology based on CEL II, also known as Surveyor Nuclease. Since then the method has been used to detect mutations and polymorphisms in many different organisms and cell types (see applications).

Surveyor nuclease was licensed from the Fox Chase Cancer Center by Transgenomic, Inc. and was subsequently sold to IDT, which currently distributes it.

== Surveyor nuclease assay workflow ==
=== DNA Extraction ===
Initially, the DNA of interest (nuclear or mitochondrial DNA) is extracted from tissues or cell culture. This can be done by standard extraction methods such as Proteinase K digestion followed by ethanol precipitation or by other commercially available methods.

If the DNA is predicted to be heterogeneous, e.g. from a pool of differentially modified cells or from heterozygous mutation carriers, there is no need to add control DNA.

=== Polymerase chain reaction ===
The region of interest in both mutant and wild-type reference DNA is amplified by polymerase chain reaction (PCR). The PCR reaction should be carried out using a high-fidelity proofreading polymerase to avoid introducing PCR errors that will be interpreted by the nuclease. The PCR reaction should be optimized to create a single, strong PCR band, as non-specific bands will increase the background noise of the assay.

If the allele of interest is expected to be present in low frequency, such as in the case of somatic mosaicism or heteroplasmic mitochondrial DNA, a modified PCR protocol that enriches variant alleles from a mixture of wild-type and mutation-containing DNA might be considered (e.g. COLD-PCR).

=== Formation of hybrid DNA duplex ===
The DNA of interest is denatured and annealed in order to form heteroduplexes containing a mismatch at the point of the mutation, which can then be identified by the Surveyor nuclease. If the DNA is predicted to be homogenous (e.g. homoplasmic mitochondrial DNA or identical alleles on both chromosomes of genomic DNA) then DNA from a control sample is needed in order to form a heteroduplex which is then recognizable by the nuclease. If the DNA sample is heterogeneous, no additional control DNA is needed; however, the PCR products should still be denatured and annealed in order to create heteroduplexes.

=== Digestion ===
The annealed DNA is treated with Surveyor nuclease to cleave the heteroduplexes. All types of mismatches are identifiable by Surveyor nuclease, although the mismatch cutting preferences fall into four groups from most to least preferred: CT, AC, and CC are preferred equally over TT, followed by AA and GG, and finally followed by the least preferred, AG and GT. Sequence context also influences the Surveyor nuclease digestion rate.

=== Analysis ===
Digested DNA products can be analyzed using conventional gel electrophoresis or high-resolution capillary electrophoresis. The detection of cleaved products indicates the presence of a heteroduplex formed by a mismatch. The location of the mutation/polymorphism can be inferred by observing the fragment length after cleavage. If fluorescent labelled primers are used to mark the 5' and 3' end of the PCR products, different colored bands will be observed in the analysis. The size of each band independently confirms the position of the mutation/polymorphism. Multiple mutations can be detected by the presence of several fragments.

== Advantages and limitations ==
=== Advantages ===
==== Advantages of mismatch nuclease assays ====
One of the main advantages of detecting mutations and polymorphisms using mismatch nuclease methods is that no previous knowledge is required regarding the nature of the mutation, as opposed to other methods, such as restriction fragment length polymorphisms (RFLP) that has been used for SNP analysis in the past.

In comparison to methods based on melting temperature, mismatch-specific endonuclease methods are not only faster, but can also detect multiple mutations in large DNA fragments.

The method is feasible to use in high-throughput systems using automated injection, making it suitable for screening.

==== Advantages of surveyor nuclease ====
Surveyor nuclease is a reasonably sensitive enzyme, producing detectable cleavage products from sequences representing only a small proportion of DNA in the population. It can detect a ratio of 1:32 heteroduplex to homoduplex for smaller PCR products (~0.6 kb), and 1:16 heteroduplex to homoduplex for longer PCR products (~2.3 kb). This property makes it possible to pool clinical samples in order to increase the heteroduplex formation and hence the sensitivity. This is also useful for detection of minor variants in a heterogeneous population (such as heterogeneous tumor). In the case of genome editing by CRISPR or other methods, this property can enhance detection of rare editing events in a population of cells prior to creation and testing of individual edited clones.

Surveyor nuclease cleaves all types of mismatches, even if some are more preferred then others: CT, AC, and CC are preferred equally over TT, followed by AA and GG, and finally followed by the least preferred, AG and GT. It also detects Indels up to at least 12 bp.

Surveyor nuclease assay can also detect multiple mutations in the same fragment. However, this requires several additional processing steps that may also increase the background of the assay (see Limitations).

=== Limitations ===
==== PCR amplification product ====
One of the main limitations of this assay is that it relies on PCR amplification, and is therefore influenced by the quality of the amplified product. PCR artifacts (e.g. primer-dimers or truncated products) can increase the background noise and obscure the signal. Primer-dimers can also inhibit the activity of surveyor nuclease, reducing the signal.

As the PCR method has the potential to introduce its own mutations during the amplification, these errors can also increase background noise. Therefore, it is best to use a high-fidelity polymerase to minimize the amplification errors.

Mitochondrial DNA analysis might be susceptible to contamination by nuclear mitochondrial DNA sequences co-amplified during the PCR reaction, thus confounding the analysis of homoplasmic versus heteroplasmic mitochondrial DNA.

In order to detect multiple mutations in the same fragment, post-PCR clean-up must be done before Surveyor nuclease digestion. Detection of multiple mismatches can also be improved by increasing time and amount of surveyor nuclease in the reaction, but this also increases the background due to non-specific cleavage.

==== Limitations of the surveyor nuclease enzyme ====
Surveyor nuclease also has a 5′ exonuclease activity that attacks the ends of double‐stranded DNA increasing background signal during extended incubation. This can be reduced by shortening the digestion time and by adding DNA polymerase.

== Applications ==
=== Confirming genome modifications using CRISPR and other methods ===
A number of genome editing technologies have emerged in recent years, including zinc-finger nucleases (ZFNs), transcription activator-like effector nucleases (TALENs) and the RNA-guided CRISPR/Cas9 nuclease system. These methods promote genome editing by introduction of a double strand DNA break, followed by repair through the non-homologous end-joining (NHEJ) or homology-directed repair (HDR) pathways. While HDR is expected to introduce a consistent modification to the genome, NHEJ can introduce a heterogeneous mix of mutations (usually small indels), which will be difficult to identify using Sanger sequencing. Point mutations and indels can be detected by surveyor nuclease assay, making it useful to detect genome editing in a pool of cells without the need for clonal expansion prior to analysis, and it can also provide an estimate of the targeting efficiency achieved. Even after clonal expansion, detection of mutations using Sanger sequence may be difficult as each allele can undergo a different editing event. In this case, the Surveyor nuclease assay will actually use this effect to create the required heteroduplexes for detection by the mismatch endonuclease.

=== Detection of germline mutations in human genes ===
Surveyor nuclease assay has been used to detect germline mutations in human genes. For example, ATRX for X-linked intellectual disability, and the HBB gene linked to β-thalassemia. The assay has also been used to detect mitochondrial and nuclear DNA mutations associated with respiratory chain defects, and mutations associated with kidney disease.

=== Detection of somatic mutations in cancer ===
Surveyor nuclease assay has been used to detect somatic mutations in various cancer-related genes, and as stated above, can be used even when the sample is heterogeneous and the mutant allele only comprises 1%–5% of the total alleles. The method has been used to detect mutations in epidermal-growth-factor-receptor (EGFR), Janus Kinase 2 (JAK2), p53 and others.

=== Other applications ===
The method has been used to detect mutations that cause drug resistance in Mycobacterium tuberculosis.
