= Denaturing high performance liquid chromatography =

Denaturing High Performance Liquid Chromatography (DHPLC) is a method of chromatography for the detection of base substitutions, small deletions or insertions in the DNA. Due to its speed and high resolution, this method is particularly useful for finding polymorphisms in DNA.

In practice, the analysis begins with a standard polymerase chain reaction (PCR) in order to amplify the fragment of interest. If the amplified region that exhibits the polymorphism(s) is heterozygous, two kinds of fragments corresponding to the allele and the wild polymorphic allele will be present in the PCR product. This first step is followed by a step of denaturation–renaturation to create hetero- and homoduplexes from the two allele populations in the PCR. To find a homozygous polymorphism, proceed in the same way by premixing a DNA wild population to a population of polymorphic DNA to obtain heteroduplexes after the denaturation–renaturation step.

Heteroduplexes are actually double strands of DNA containing a strand from the wild-type allele and a sprig from the polymorphic allele. The formation of such DNA fragments then causes the appearance of a "mismatch" or bad pairing where the polymorphism is located.

These "mismatches" in the heteroduplex are the basis for the polymorphism detection by DHPLC. Heteroduplexes are thermally less stable than their corresponding homoduplexes, and the single DNA strands will therefore be disconnected by chromatography when subjected to a sufficiently high temperature. The consequence of this double strand instability will be a mismatch of the two DNA strands in the region of polymorphism when DNA is heated to the DNA melting temperature. This mismatch will therefore decrease the interaction with the column and will result in a reduced retention time compared to the homoduplexes in the chromatographic separation process.

To observe the phenomenon of separation, the DHPLC method uses a column of a non-grafted porous stationary phase composed of polystyrene-divinylbenzene alkyl. The stationary phase is electrically neutral and hydrophobic. The DNA, however, is negatively charged at its phosphate groups and therefore can adsorb itself on the column. In order to make the adsorption possible, triethylammonium acetate (TEAA) is used. The positively charged ammonium ion of these molecules interacts with the DNA, and the alkyl chain with the hydrophobic surface of the solid phase.

Therefore, when heteroduplexes are partially denaturated by heating, the negative charges undergo partial relocation and the interaction force between DNA heteroduplexes and column decreases in comparison to the strength of interaction of the homoduplexes. These will therefore be eluted less rapidly by the mobile phase (consisting of acetonitrile).

== Mutation screening ==
DHPLC is widely used as a high-throughput mutation-screening method in both research and diagnostic applications, but samples with altered chromatographic patterns generally still require follow-up DNA sequencing to identify the exact variant. Early reports highlighted automated instrumentation, analyses of about 5 minutes per sample, and the ability to analyze PCR fragments up to 1.5 kb.
