= LEAPER gene editing =

Gene editing method

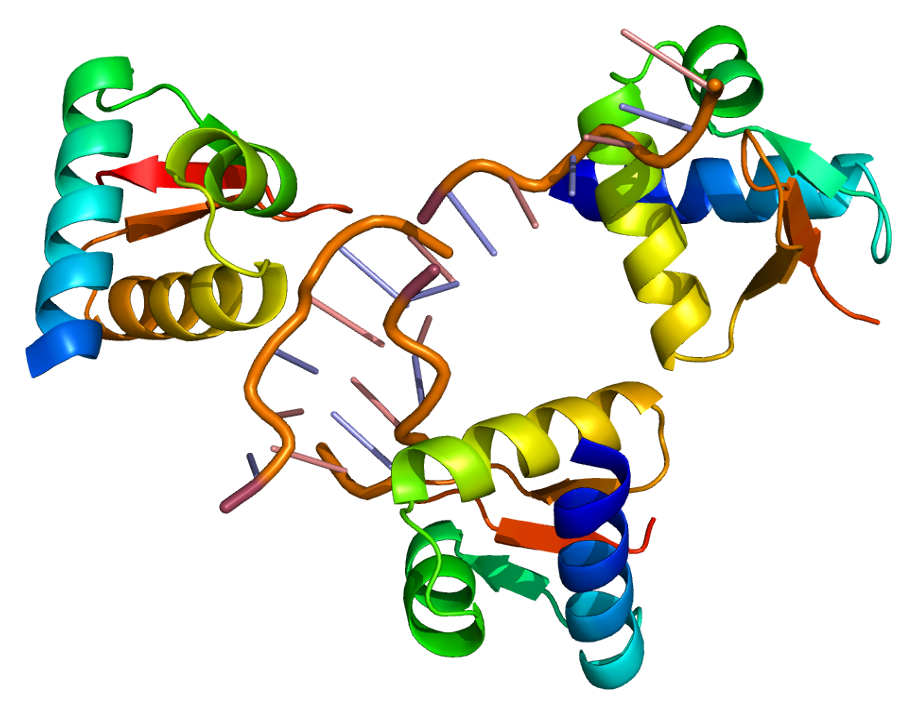
The technique utilizes native ADAR enzymes (pictured with RNA).

LEAPER (Leveraging endogenous ADAR for programmable editing of RNA) is a genetic engineering technique in molecular biology by which RNA can be edited. The technique relies on engineered strands of RNA to recruit native ADAR enzymes to swap out different compounds in RNA. Developed by researchers at Peking University in 2019, the technique, some have claimed, is more efficient than the CRISPR gene editing technique. Initial studies have claimed that editing efficiencies of up to 80%.

== Synopsis ==
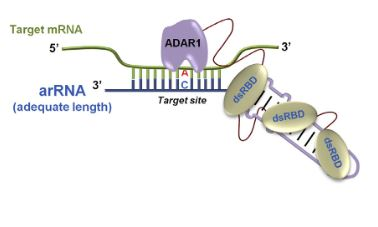
LEAPER-mediated RNA Editing

As opposed to DNA gene editing techniques (e.g., using CRISPR-Cas proteins to make modifications directly to a defective gene), LEAPER targets editing messenger RNA (mRNA) for the same gene which is transcribed into a protein. Post-transcriptional RNA modification typically involves the strategy of converting adenosine-to-inosine (A-to-I) since inosine (I) demonstrably mimics guanosine (G) during translation into a protein. A-to-I editing is catalyzed by adenosine deaminase acting on RNA (ADAR) enzymes, whose substrates are double-stranded RNAs. Three human ADAR genes have been identified with ADAR1 (official symbol ADAR) and ADAR2 (ADARB1) proteins developed activity profiles. LEAPER achieves this targeted RNA editing through the use of short engineered ADAR-recruiting RNAs (arRNAs). arRNAs consist of endogenous ADAR1 proteins with several RNA binding domains (RBDs) fused with a peptide, CRISPR-Cas13b protein, and a guide RNA (gRNA) between 100 and 150 nt in length for high editing efficiency designed to recruit the chimeric ADAR protein to a target site.

This results in a change in which protein is synthesized during translation.

== History ==
The technique was discovered by a team of researchers at Peking University in Beijing, China. The discovery was announced in the journal Nature Biotechnology in July 2019.

== Applications ==
Chinese researchers have utilized LEAPER to restore functional enzyme activity in cells from patients with Hurler syndrome. They have claimed that LEAPER could have the potential to treat almost half of all known hereditary disorders.

Highly specific editing efficiencies of up to 80% can be achieved when LEAPER editing using arRNA151 is delivered via a plasmid or viral vector or as a synthetic oligonucleotide, though this efficiency varied significantly across cell types. Based on these preliminary results, LEAPER may have the most therapeutic promise with no production of functional protein but if a partial restoration of protein expression would provide therapeutic benefit. For example, in human cells with defective α-L-iduronidase (IDUA) expression in cells from patients with IDUA-defective Hurler syndrome, LEAPER resulted in a W53X truncation mutant of p53 being edited using arRNA151 to achieve a "normal" p53 translation and functional p53-mediated transcriptional responses.

=== Comparison to CRISPR ===
LEAPER is analogous to CRISPR Cas-13 in that it targets RNA before proteins are synthesized. However, LEAPER is simpler and more efficient as it only requires arRNA, rather than Cas and a guide RNA. According to the developers of LEAPER, it has the potential to be easier and more precise than any CRISPR technique.

LEAPER also eliminates health concerns and technical barriers arising from the introduction of exogenous proteins.

It has also been called more ethical as it does not change DNA and thus does not result in heritable changes, unlike methods using CRISPR Cas-9.

== See also ==
- CRISPR gene editing
- Gene knockout
- NgAgo
- Prime editing
