= Triethylammonium acetate =

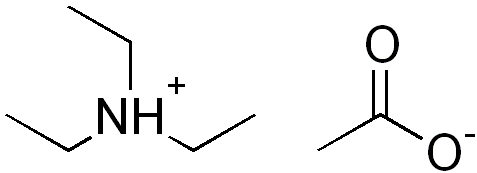

Names
- IUPAC name Triethylammonium acetate
- Other names teaa, triethylamine/acetate buffer

Identifiers
CAS Number	5204-74-0
3D model (JSmol)	Interactive image
ChemSpider	144908
ECHA InfoCard	100.023.632
PubChem CID	165295
CompTox Dashboard (EPA)	DTXSID5063736
- InChI: InChI=1S/C6H15N.C2H4O2/c1-4-7(5-2)6-3;1-2(3)4/h4-6H2,1-3H3;1H3,(H,3,4) Key: AVBGNFCMKJOFIN-UHFFFAOYSA-N; InChI=1/C6H15N.C2H4O2/c1-4-7(5-2)6-3;1-2(3)4/h4-6H2,1-3H3;1H3,(H,3,4) Key: AVBGNFCMKJOFIN-UHFFFAOYAA
- SMILES: O=C([O-])C.CC[N+H](CC)CC

Properties
Chemical formula	(CH_{3}CH_{2})_{3}NHOCOCH_{3}
Molar mass	161.245 g·mol^{−1}
Boiling point	164.5 °C (328.1 °F; 437.6 K)
Solubility in water	Soluble

Hazards
- Occupational safety and health (OHS/OSH)
Main hazards	Corrosive, harmful
- GHS labelling
Pictograms	(GHS07: Exclamation mark)
Signal word	Warning
Hazard statements	H315, H319, H335
Precautionary statements	P261, P264, P264+P265, P271, P280, P302+P352, P304+P340, P305+P351+P338, P319, P321, P332+P317, P337+P317, P362+P364, P403+P233, P405, P501
- Except where otherwise noted, data are given for materials in their standard state (at 25 °C [77 °F], 100 kPa). verify (what is ?) Infobox references

Triethylammonium acetate is a volatile salt, which is often used as an ion-pairing reagent in high-performance liquid chromatography separations of oligonucleotides.
