= POLQ =

Protein-coding gene in the species Homo sapiens

Identifiers
- Aliases: POLQ, POLH, PRO0327, polymerase (DNA) theta, DNA polymerase theta, DNA polymerase θ
- External IDs: OMIM: 604419; MGI: 2155399; GeneCards: POLQ
Available structures
PDB	Ortholog search: PDBe RCSB
PDB	List of PDB id codes 4X0P, 4X0Q, 5AGA, 5A9J, 5A9F
Enzyme activity
EC #	BRENDA	ExPASy	KEGG	MetaCyc
2.7.7.7	↗	↗	↗	↗
2.7.7.49	↗	↗	↗	↗
5.6.2.4	↗	↗	↗	↗

Gene location (Human)
Chr.	Chromosome 3 (human)
Band	3q13.33	Start	121,431,431 bp
Band	3q13.33	End	121,545,988 bp

Gene location (Mouse)
Chr.	Chromosome 16 (mouse)
Band	16 B3|16 26.32 cM	Start	36,832,148 bp
Band	16 B3|16 26.32 cM	End	36,915,779 bp
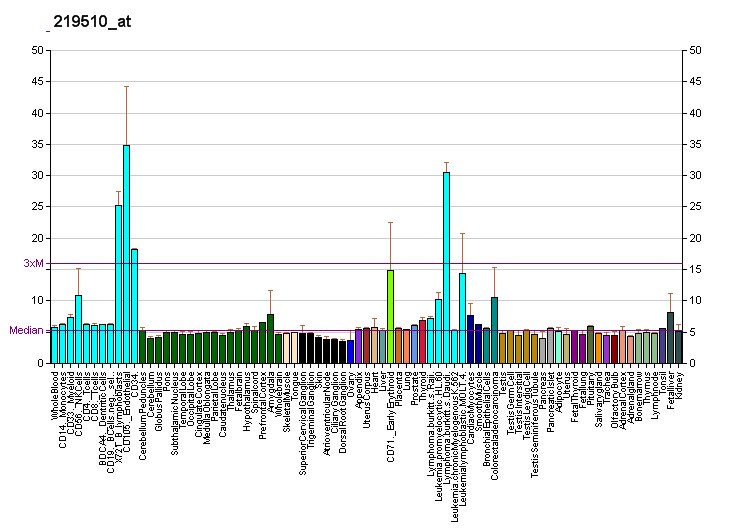
RNA expression pattern
Bgee	Human / Mouse (ortholog); Top expressed in: secondary oocyte; testicle; ventricular zone; bone marrow; ganglionic eminence; bone marrow cell; trabecular bone; stromal cell of endometrium; mucosa of transverse colon; gingival epithelium / Top expressed in: tail of embryo; genital tubercle; morula; spermatocyte; ventricular zone; yolk sac; embryo; zygote; blastocyst; secondary oocyte; More reference expression data
BioGPS	More reference expression data
Gene ontology
Molecular function	transferase activity; nucleotide binding; DNA binding; nucleotidyltransferase activity; single-stranded DNA helicase activity; 5'-deoxyribose-5-phosphate lyase activity; chromatin binding; damaged DNA binding; protein binding; nucleic acid binding; DNA-directed DNA polymerase activity; ATP binding; 5'-3' exonuclease activity; identical protein binding
Cellular component	nucleoplasm; chromosome; nucleus; cytoplasm
Biological process	somatic hypermutation of immunoglobulin genes; negative regulation of double-strand break repair via homologous recombination; double-strand break repair via alternative nonhomologous end joining; cellular response to DNA damage stimulus; DNA replication; double-strand break repair via homologous recombination; protein homooligomerization; DNA repair; base-excision repair; DNA biosynthetic process; double-strand break repair; DNA-dependent DNA replication; nucleic acid phosphodiester bond hydrolysis
Sources:Amigo / QuickGO
Orthologs
Databases	NCBI: entry; OMA: entry
Species	Human	Mouse
Entrez	10721	77782
Ensembl	ENSG00000051341	ENSMUSG00000034206
UniProt	O75417	Q8CGS6
RefSeq (mRNA)	NM_199420; NM_006596	NM_001159369; NM_029977
RefSeq (protein)	NP_955452	NP_001152841; NP_084253
Location (UCSC)	Chr 3: 121.43 – 121.55 Mb	Chr 16: 36.83 – 36.92 Mb
PubMed search
- Wikidata
View/Edit Human	View/Edit Mouse

DNA polymerase theta is an enzyme that in humans is encoded by the POLQ gene. This polymerase plays a key role in one of the three major double strand break repair pathways: theta-mediated end joining (TMEJ). Most double-strand breaks are repaired by non-homologous end joining (NHEJ) or homology directed repair (HDR). However, in some contexts, NHEJ and HR are insufficient and TMEJ is the only solution to repair the break.

TMEJ is often described as alternative NHEJ, but differs in that it lacks a requirement for the Ku heterodimer, and it can only act on resected DNA ends. Following annealing of short (i.e., a few nucleotides) regions on the DNA overhangs, DNA polymerase theta catalyzes template-dependent DNA synthesis across the broken ends, stabilizing the paired structure.

== Polymerase theta's mutational signature ==
TMEJ is intrinsically mutagenic, since polymerase theta uses homologous nucleotides from both break ends to initiate repair, which leads to loss of one set of these nucleotides in the DNA sequence. Therefore, TMEJ is a form of micro-homology mediated end joining (MMEJ). Moreover, when break ends are not stabilized properly, the break ends can detach after polymerization. When these polymerized ends anneal again, a templated insert arises between the deletion junctions.

== Reverse transcription of RNA ==
Polθ promotes RNA-templated DNA repair. Previously, DNA polymerases were long thought to only transcribe DNA into DNA or RNA and not be able to write RNA segments into DNA.
