= Cytokinin dehydrogenase =

Identifiers
- EC no.: 1.5.99.12

Databases
- IntEnz: IntEnz view
- BRENDA: BRENDA entry
- ExPASy: NiceZyme view
- KEGG: KEGG entry
- MetaCyc: metabolic pathway
- PRIAM: profile
- PDB structures: RCSB PDB PDBe PDBsum
- Gene Ontology: AmiGO / QuickGO
Search
- PMC: articles
- PubMed: articles
- NCBI: proteins

Cytokinin dehydrogenase (EC 1.5.99.12) is an enzyme that catalyzes the chemical reaction

N6-isopentenyladenine
+ electron
acceptor
H_{2}O
H_{2}O
adenine
+ reduced
acceptor
+
3-methyl-2-butenal

The three substrates of this enzyme are a cytokinin such as N6-isopentenyladenine, an electron acceptor, and water. Its products are adenine, 3-methyl-2-butenal (or other aldehyde in case of different substrates), and the corresponding reduced acceptor.

This enzyme belongs to the family of oxidoreductases, specifically those acting on the CH-NH group of donors with other acceptors. The systematic name of this enzyme class is N^{6}-dimethylallyladenine:acceptor oxidoreductase. Other names in common use include N^{6}-dimethylallyladenine:(acceptor) oxidoreductase, 6-N-dimethylallyladenine:acceptor oxidoreductase, and cytokinin oxidase/dehydrogenase abbreviated as CKX.

== Structural studies ==
As of late 2007, 6 structures have been solved for this class of enzymes, with PDB accession codes 1W1O, 1W1Q, 1W1R, 1W1S, 2EXR, and 2Q4W. As of 2026, there have been 18 structures recorded.
