= List of cis-regulatory RNA elements =

This is a list of cis-regulatory RNAs. These are RNA motifs which regulate nucleic acid regions on the same molecule, as opposed to trans-acting motifs which regulate a distal molecule. Some of these RNAs are broadly distributed while others are single RNA families.

== # ==
- 23S methyl RNA motif
- 6C RNA

== A ==
- Actino-pnp RNA motif
- AdoCbl riboswitch
- Alfalfa mosaic virus coat protein binding (CPB) RNA
- Alfalfa mosaic virus RNA 1 5′ UTR stem-loop
- Alpha operon ribosome binding site
- Antizyme RNA frameshifting stimulation element
- APC internal ribosome entry site
- Aphthovirus internal ribosome entry site
- Apolipoprotein B (apoB) 5′ UTR cis-regulatory element
- aspS RNA motif
- AtoC RNA motif
- atpB RNA motif
- ATPC RNA motif
- AU-rich element

== B ==
- Bacteroid-trp RNA motif
- Bag-1 internal ribosome entry site (IRES)
- Bamboo mosaic potexvirus (BaMV) cis-regulatory element
- Bamboo mosaic virus satellite RNA cis-regulatory element
- Bovine leukaemia virus RNA packaging signal
- Burkholderiales-2 RNA motif

== C ==
- Chlorobi-RRM RNA motif
- chrB RNA motif
- Citrus tristeza virus replication signal
- CrcB RNA motif
- Ctgf/hcs24 CAESAR
- COG3860 RNA motif
- Cap-independent translation element

== D ==
- DABA-DC-AT RNA motif
- DUF1874 RNA motif
- DUF3085 RNA motif
- DUF3577 RNA motif

== E ==
- EngA RNA motif
- Enterobacteria greA leader
- Enterobacteria rnk leader
- Enteroviral 3′ UTR element
- Enterovirus 5′ cloverleaf cis-acting replication element
- Enterovirus cis-acting replication element

== F ==
- Fibro-purF RNA motif
- FIE3 (ftz instability element 3′) element
- Flavivirus capsid hairpin cHP
- Flg-Rhizobiales RNA motif
- FlpD RNA motif
- folE RNA motif
- folP RNA motif
- Freshwater-2 RNA motif
- FTHFS RNA motif
- Fusobacteriales-1 RNA motif

== G ==
- G-CSF factor stem-loop destabilising element
- Gammaproteobacteria rimP leader
- gltS RNA motif
- GP20 RNA motif

== H ==
- Heat shock protein 70 internal ribosome entry site
- Hepatitis C alternative reading frame stem-loop
- Hepatitis C stem-loop IV
- Hepatitis C virus (HCV) cis-acting replication element (CRE)
- Hepatitis C virus 3'X element
- Hepatitis C virus stem-loop VII
- Hepatitis E virus cis-reactive element
- HIV gag stem loop 3 (GSL3)
- HopC RNA motif
- Human parechovirus 1 (HPeV1) cis regulatory element (CRE)
- Human rhinovirus internal cis-acting regulatory element (CRE)
- hya RNA motif

== I ==
- IbpB thermometer
- ilvB-OMG RNA motif
- ilvH RNA motif
- Infectious bronchitis virus D-RNA
- ivy-DE RNA motif

== J ==
- JUMPstart RNA motif

== L ==
- L17DE RNA motif
- ldcC RNA motif
- LivK RNA motif
- Lnt RNA motif
- Luteovirus cap-independent translation element (BTE)
- lysM RNA motifs

== M ==
- Magnesium responsive RNA element
- malK RNA motifs
- Mason-Pfizer monkey virus packaging signal
- Mnt IRES
- MraW RNA motif
- MsiK RNA motif

== N ==
- N-myc IRES
- Nanos 3′ UTR translation control element
- narK RNA motif
- nhaA-II RNA motif
- NLPC-P60 RNA motif
- NuoG RNA motif

== P ==
- P27 cis-regulatory element
- pemK RNA motif
- Peptidase-S11 RNA motif
- PGK RNA motif
- Potassium channel RNA editing signal
- Potato virus X cis-acting regulatory element
- PotC RNA motif
- Poxvirus AX element late mRNA cis-regulatory element
- Prion pseudoknot
- PsbNH RNA motif
- Pseudomon-groES RNA motif
- Pseudomonas rnk leader
- Pseudomonas rpsL leader
- PyrG leader
- PyrR binding site

== R ==
- R2 RNA element
- RbcL 5′ UTR RNA stabilising element
- Red clover necrotic mosaic virus translation enhancer elements
- Regulatory region of repZ gene
- Retrovirus direct repeat 1 (dr1)
- Ribosomal protein L10 leader
- Ribosomal protein L13 leader
- Ribosomal protein L19 leader
- Ribosomal protein L20 leader
- Ribosomal protein L21 leader
- Ribosomal S15 leader
- RNase E 5′ UTR element
- RncO
- Rne-II RNA motif
- Rotavirus cis-acting replication element (CRE)
- Rothia-sucC RNA motif
- Rous sarcoma virus (RSV) primer binding site (PBS)
- RtT RNA
- Rubella virus 3′ cis-acting element

== S ==
- S-element
- SerC leader
- Simian virus 40 late polyadenylation signal (SVLPA)
- SpeF leader
- Spi-1 (PU.1) 5′ UTR regulatory element
- ssnA RNA motif
- Sxy 5′ UTR element

== T ==
- T-box leader
- terC RNA motif
- Termite-leu RNA motif
- Thermales-rpoB RNA motif
- Togavirus 5′ plus strand cis-regulatory element
- Tombusvirus 3′ UTR region IV
- Tombusvirus 5′ UTR
- Tombusvirus internal replication element (IRE)
- Tobamovirus IRES
- Transfer RNA-like structures
- TrkB IRES
- Turnip crinkle virus (TCV) core promoter hairpin (Pr)
- Turnip crinkle virus (TCV) repressor of minus strand synthesis H5

== U ==
- U1A polyadenylation inhibition element (PIE)
- UnaL2 LINE 3′ element

== V ==
- Vimentin 3′ UTR protein-binding region
- Voltage-gated potassium-channel Kv1.4 IRES

== W ==
- Wingless localisation element 3 (WLE3)

== X ==
- xerDC RNA motif

== Y ==
- YbhL leader
- YdaO/yuaA leader
- YkkC-yxkD leader
- YybP-ykoY leader

== See also ==
- List of RNAs
