= TBOX =

TBOX or Tbox may refer to

== Computing ==
- TBox and ABox, terminology and assertion statements in knowledge bases

== Other uses ==
- Railbox, a railroad company with several reporting marks, including TBOX
- Tbox, another name for a bush bass, a musical instrument
- TBOX, an acronym for The Twelve Bars of Christmas, a Chicago pub crawl

== See also ==
- T-box, transcription factors involved in limb and heart development
- T-box leader, a riboswitch involved in sensing tRNA aminoacylation
- Flaccid paralysis
