= Anti-Q RNA =

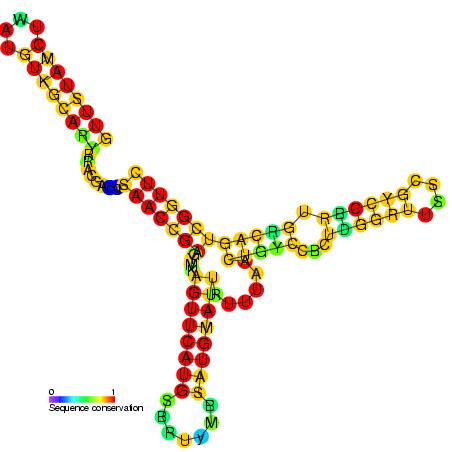
- Predicted secondary structure and sequence conservation of Anti-Q RNA

Identifiers
- Symbol: Anti-Q_RNA
- Alt. Symbols: QaRNA
- Rfam: RF00388

Other data
- RNA type: Gene; antisense
- Domain(s): Bacteria
- SO: SO:0000644
- PDB structures: PDBe

Anti-Q RNA (formerly Qa RNA) is a small ncRNA from the conjugal plasmid pCF10 of Enterococcus faecalis. It is coded in cis to its regulatory target, prgQ, but can also act in trans. Anti-Q is known to interact with nascent prgQ transcripts to allow formation of an intrinsic terminator, or attenuator, thus preventing transcription of downstream genes. This mode of regulation is essentially the same as that of the countertranscript-driven attenuators that control copy number in pT181, pAMbeta1 and pIP501 and related Staphylococcal plasmids.

Anti-Q is transcribed from the same segment of DNA as prgQ, except from the opposite strand, making it perfectly complementary to a portion of prgQ. Further experiments have experimentally confirmed the original consensus secondary structure and demonstrated that only certain regions of Anti-Q interact with prgQ.

Anti-Q is derived from the 5’ end a longer transcript. The 3’ end of this transcript encodes PrgX, a repressor of prgQ transcription.
