= BTE (disambiguation) =

BTE or bte may refer to:

- Boltzmann transport equation
- Barley yellow dwarf virus-like cap-independent translation element, a RNA element
- Behind the ear hearing aid
- Better Than Ezra, a rock band
- Bristol Technology and Engineering Academy
- bte. for binte, "daughter of", a component of an Arabic name
- Being The Elite, video journals on YouTube, primarily featuring Bullet Club and The Elite
- Build the Earth, a Minecraft project
- Board of Technical Education (disambiguation)
