= Enterobacteria greA leader =

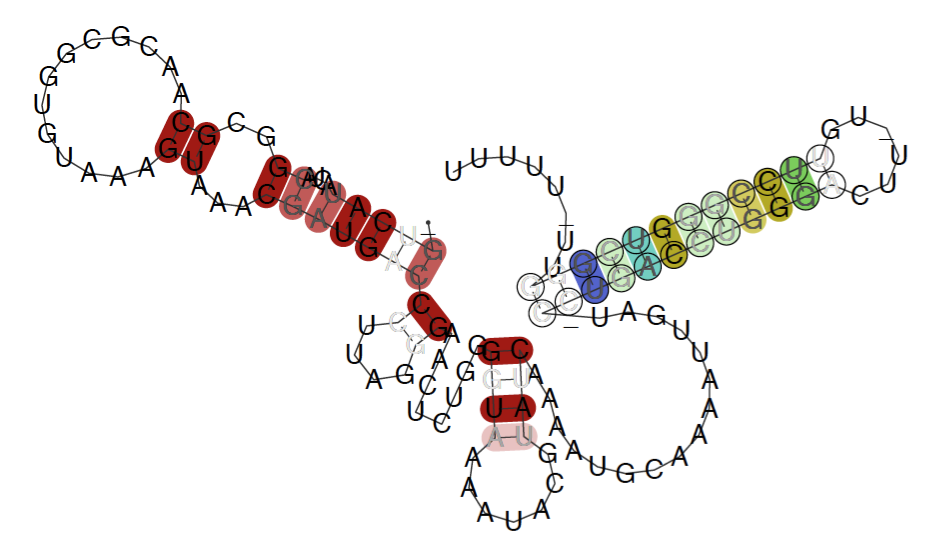
- Conserved secondary structure of greA leader, colours represent the fraction of canonical base pairs

Identifiers
- Symbol: greA_leader
- Rfam: RF01769

Other data
- RNA type: Cis-reg; leader
- Domain(s): Enterobacteriales
- PDB structures: PDBe

The Enterobacteria greA leader is a putative attenuator element identified by bioinformatics within bacteria of the γ-proteobacterial Enterobacteriales order. It is located upstream of the rnk gene, encoding a transcription elongation factor, and presents a Rho-independent terminator at the 3' end. This RNA is presumed to operate as a non-coding leader, which regulatory mechanism remains to be elucidated. The short abortive form of the greA transcript may also play a role as an independent sRNA: Potrykus et al. have shown that its overexpression leads to the repression of several genes. The motif might be related to other rnk leaders such as the Pseudomonas rnk leader and the Enterobacteria rnk leader.

== See also ==
- Gammaproteobacteria rimP leader
