= GA-cis RNA motif =

GA-cis
- Consensus secondary structure and sequence conservation of GA-cis RNA

Identifiers
- Symbol: GA-cis
- Rfam: RF02987

Other data
- RNA type: Gene; sRNA
- SO: SO:0001263
- PDB structures: PDBe

The GA-cis RNA motif is a conserved RNA structure that was discovered by bioinformatics. GA-cis motif RNAs are found in one species classified within the phylum Bacillota: specifically, there are 9 predicted copies in Coprocuccus eutactus ATCC 27759.

GA-cis RNAs are generally located in the 5' untranslated regions of protein-coding genes. Indeed, the RNAs are upstream of multiple genes that encode non-homologous proteins. If all examples of the RNA were upstream of homologous genes, there is the possibility that the RNAs were conserved in that position simply by inheritance. The non-homology of the genes downstream of COG2908 RNAs makes this scenario less likely. This evidence suggests that GA-cis RNAs function as cis-regulatory elements. However, due to some cases where a GA-cis RNA is not immediately upstream of a gene makes this hypothesis tentative.

The GA-cis RNA motif is named because of the frequent occurrence of conserved GpA di-nucleotides in its sequence, and its locations that are typical of cis-regulatory elements.
