= Cardiovirus cis-acting replication element =

Cardiovirus cis-acting replication element (CRE)
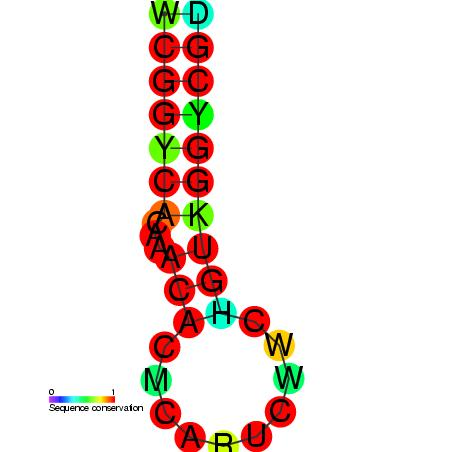
- Predicted secondary structure and sequence conservation of Cardiovirus_CRE

Identifiers
- Symbol: Cardiovirus_CRE
- Rfam: RF00453

Other data
- RNA type: Cis-reg
- Domain(s): Viruses
- SO: SO:0000233
- PDB structures: PDBe

This family represents a Cardiovirus cis-acting replication element (CRE) which is located within the region encoding the capsid protein VP2 and is required for viral replication.

== See also ==
- Citrus tristeza virus replication signal
- Rubella virus 3' cis-acting element
