= Vanc =

vanc may refer to:

- Vertical Ancillary Data Space, ancillary data located in non-picture regions of the video frame (Vertical ANCillary data)
- Andreea Ehritt-Vanc (born 1973), Polish tennis player
- D-alanine—D-serine ligase, an enzyme (EC 6.3.2.35, VanC; also known as VanE and VanG)
- Vancomycin, an antibiotic
- Vancouver system, also known as Vancouver reference style or the author–number system
