= Rothia-sucC RNA motif =

Rothia-sucC
- Consensus secondary structure and sequence conservation of Rothia-sucC RNA

Identifiers
- Symbol: Rothia-sucC
- Rfam: RF03024

Other data
- RNA type: Cis-reg
- SO: SO:0005836
- PDB structures: PDBe

The Rothia-sucC RNA motif is a conserved RNA structure that was discovered by bioinformatics. Rothia-sucC motif RNAs are found in the actinobacterial genus Rothia.

Rothia-sucC motif RNAs likely function as cis-regulatory elements, in view of their positions upstream of protein-coding genes. The presumably regulated genes encode Succinyl coenzyme A synthetase, which is a part of the citric acid cycle. These and related metabolically genes have previously been proposed to be regulated by the sucA RNA motif and the sucC RNA motif, but the conserved sequence and structure features of these motifs suggest they are not structurally related, although they might perform similar biological functions.
