= Board of Technical Education =

Board of Technical Education may refer to:

== India ==
- Board of Technical Education, Delhi
- Board of Technical Education, Uttar Pradesh
- Maharashtra State Board of Technical Education
- State Board of Technical Education, Bihar

== Elsewhere ==
- Bangladesh Technical Education Board
- National Board for Technical Education, Nigeria
