= Hepatitis C stem-loop IV =

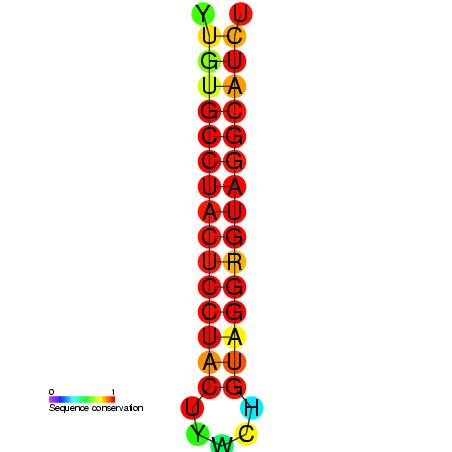
- Predicted secondary structure and sequence conservation of HCV_SLIV

Identifiers
- Symbol: HCV_SLIV
- Rfam: RF00469

Other data
- RNA type: Cis-reg
- Domain(s): Viruses
- SO: SO:0000233
- PDB structures: PDBe

The Hepatitis C stem-loop IV is part of a putative RNA element found in the NS5B coding region. This element along with stem-loop VII, is important (but not essential) for colony formation, though its exact function and mechanism are unknown.

== See also ==
- Hepatitis C alternative reading frame stem-loop
- Hepatitis C virus (HCV) cis-acting replication element (CRE)
- Hepatitis C virus 3'X element
- Hepatitis E virus cis-reactive element
