= Hepatitis C virus cis-acting replication element =

Hepatitis C virus (HCV) cis-acting replication element (CRE)
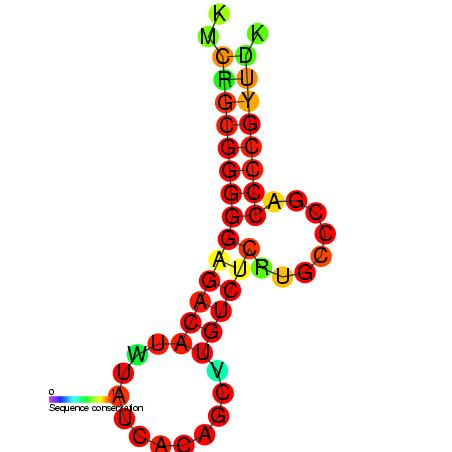
- Predicted secondary structure and sequence conservation of HepC_CRE

Identifiers
- Symbol: HepC_CRE
- Rfam: RF00260

Other data
- RNA type: Cis-reg
- Domain(s): Viruses
- SO: SO:0000233
- PDB structures: PDBe

The Hepatitis C virus (HCV) cis-acting replication element (CRE) is an RNA element which is found in the coding region of the RNA-dependent RNA polymerase NS5B. Mutations in this family have been found to cause a blockage in RNA replication and it is thought that both the primary sequence and the structure of this element are crucial for HCV RNA replication.

== See also ==
- Hepatitis C alternative reading frame stem-loop
- Hepatitis C virus 3'X element
- Hepatitis C virus stem-loop VII
- Hepatitis C stem-loop IV
- Hepatitis C
