= Thermales-rpoB RNA motif =

Thermales-rpoB
- Consensus secondary structure and sequence conservation of Thermales-rpoB RNA

Identifiers
- Symbol: Thermales-rpoB
- Rfam: RF03109

Other data
- RNA type: Cis-reg
- SO: SO:0005836
- PDB structures: PDBe

The Thermales-rpoB RNA motif is a conserved RNA structure that was discovered by bioinformatics. Thermales-rpoB motifs are found in Thermales.

Thermales-rpoB motif RNAs likely function as cis-regulatory elements, in view of their positions upstream of protein-coding genes, which invariably encode subunits of RNA polymerase. Such genes are also believed to be regulated by the Rhodo-rpoB RNA motif, although these two motifs occur in quite diverged lineages of bacteria.
