= AspS RNA motif =

Conserved RNA structure

aspS
- Consensus secondary structure and sequence conservation of aspS RNA

Identifiers
- Symbol: aspS
- Rfam: RF02930

Other data
- RNA type: Cis-reg
- SO: SO:0005836
- PDB structures: PDBe

The aspS RNA motif is a conserved RNA structure that was discovered by bioinformatics. aspS motifs are found in a specific lineage of Actinomycetota.

aspS motif RNAs likely function as cis-regulatory elements, in view of their positions upstream of protein-coding genes. Instances of the aspS RNA motif are often located nearby to the predicted Shine-Dalgarno sequence of the downstream gene. This arrangement is consistent with a model of cis-regulation where the RNA allosterically controls access to the Shine-Dalgarno sequence, thus regulating the gene translationally.

aspS genes encode aminoacyl tRNA synthetases. T-box leader RNAs detect low levels of various amino acids, and regulate genes in a cis-regulatory manner. Genes regulated by T-box RNAs often include aminoacyl tRNA synthetases. It is possible that aspS RNAs are diverged examples of T-box RNAs, or they might implement a different structural solution to the same biological problem.
