= SucA-II RNA motif =

Biologic structure

sucA-II RNA
- Consensus secondary structure of sucA-II RNAs

Identifiers
- Symbol: sucA-II RNA
- Rfam: RF01758

Other data
- RNA type: Cis-regulatory element
- Domain(s): Pseudomonas
- PDB structures: PDBe

The sucA-II RNA motif is a conserved RNA structure identified by bioinformatics. It is consistently found in the presumed 5' untranslated regions of sucA genes, which encode Oxoglutarate dehydrogenase enzymes that participate in the citric acid cycle. Given this arrangement, sucA-II RNAs might regulate the downstream sucA gene. This genetic arrangement is similar to the previously reported sucA RNA motif. However, sucA-II RNAs are found only in bacteria classified within the genus Pseudomonas, whereas the previously reported motif is found only in betaproteobacteria.

== See also ==
- SucA RNA motif
- SucC RNA motif
