= Hepatitis C virus 3'X element =

RNA element

Hepatitis C virus 3′X element
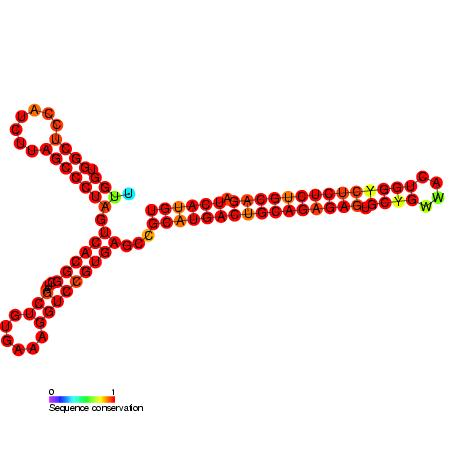
- Predicted secondary structure and sequence conservation of HCV_X3

Identifiers
- Symbol: HCV_X3
- Rfam: RF00481

Other data
- RNA type: Cis-reg
- Domain: Viruses
- SO: SO:0000233
- PDB structures: PDBe

The hepatitis C virus 3′X element is an RNA element which contains three stem-loop structures that are essential for replication.

== See also ==
- Hepatitis C alternative reading frame stem-loop
- Hepatitis C stem-loop IV
- Hepatitis C virus stem-loop VII
- Hepatitis C virus (HCV) cis-acting replication element (CRE)
