= PGK RNA motif =

PGK
- Consensus secondary structure and sequence conservation of PGK RNA

Identifiers
- Symbol: PGK
- Rfam: RF03040

Other data
- RNA type: Cis-reg
- SO: SO:0005836
- PDB structures: PDBe

The PGK RNA motif is a conserved RNA structure that was discovered by bioinformatics. PGK motif RNAs are found in metagenomic sequences isolated from the gastrointestinal tract of mammals. PGK RNAs have not yet (as of 2018) been detected in a classified organism.

PGK motif RNAs likely function as cis-regulatory elements, in view of their positions upstream of protein-coding genes. Indeed, the RNAs are upstream of multiple genes that encode non-homologous proteins. If all examples of the RNA were upstream of homologous genes, there is the possibility that the RNAs were conserved in that position simply by inheritance. The non-homology of the genes downstream of COG2908 RNAs makes this scenario less likely.

Genes apparently regulated by PGK RNAs include those encoding phosphoglycerate kinase and acetylglucosaminyltransferase of unknown substrate specificity (see also Glycosyltransferase), as well as less common gene classes. PGK RNAs are typically followed by Rho-independent transcription terminators, which could be a part of the mechanism for gene regulation that is used by the PGK RNA motif.
