= TerC RNA motif =

terC RNA
- Predicted secondary structure and sequence conservation of terC

Identifiers
- Symbol: terC
- Rfam: RF03067

Other data
- RNA type: Cis-reg;
- SO: SO:0005836
- PDB structures: PDBe

The terC RNA motif is a conserved RNA structure that was discovered by bioinformatics. terC motif RNAs are found in Pseudomonadota, within the sub-lineages Alphaproteobacteria and Pseudomonadales.

terC motif RNAs likely function as cis-regulatory elements, in view of their positions upstream of protein-coding genes. Indeed, the RNAs are upstream of multiple genes that encode non-homologous proteins. If all examples of the RNA were upstream of homologous genes, there is the possibility that the RNAs were conserved in that position simply by inheritance. The non-homology of the genes downstream of terC RNAs makes this scenario less likely.

When considering the conserved protein domains contained in proteins that are encoded by terC-regulated genes, the most frequent are classified as TIGR03717 and TIGR03718, according to the Conserved domain database. Both TIGR03717 and TIGR03718 are homologous with the membrane-bound protein known as TerC. TerC proteins are implicated in tellurium resistance.

A separate conserved RNA, originally known as the YybP-ykoY leader, is now known to function as a manganese-sensing riboswitch. Genes regulated by these manganese riboswitches very frequently encode proteins similar to TerC. In view of this association, it was proposed that terC RNAs might also function as riboswitches that sense an ion similar to manganese. Experimental confirmation of this hypothesis is lacking. However, the conserved domain known as "COG3809" is also commonly regulated by terC RNAs as well as manganese riboswitches, providing another possible link between these conserved RNA structures.
