= Ivy-DE RNA motif =

Conserved DNA structure

ivy-DE
- Consensus secondary structure and sequence conservation of ivy-DE RNA

Identifiers
- Symbol: ivy-DE
- Rfam: RF02999

Other data
- RNA type: Cis-reg
- SO: SO:0005836
- PDB structures: PDBe

The ivy-DE RNA motif is a conserved RNA structure that was discovered by bioinformatics. ivy-DE motifs are found in the genus Pseudomonas.

ivy-DE motif RNAs likely function as cis-regulatory elements, in view of their positions that are consistently downstream of protein-coding genes. However, the RNA is most likely located in the 3′ UTR of the regulated (upstream) genes, even though cis-regulatory RNAs in bacteria generally reside in the 5′ UTR. No genetic elements are consistently located downstream of ivy-DE motif RNAs, so the RNAs could be regulators within the 3′ UTR. However, it is possible that they are co-transcribed with the upstream genes and function rather as small RNAs.

ivy-DE motif RNAs are downstream of ivy (inhibitor of vertebrate lysozyme) genes. ivy proteins are used by bacteria and have shown to be potent inhibitors of vertebrate lysozymes (see ). However, other biological functions have been proposed. Additionally, at least in Pseudomonas aeruginosa PAO1, the RNA is associated with a gene that encodes a homolog of the ivy protein that does not actually inhibit lysozyme. The function of this gene is unknown, but its expression increases in bacterial strains that overexpress the PhrS small RNA and during hypoxic growth.
