= Rhizobiales-2 RNA motif =

Rhizobiales-2 RNA
- Consensus secondary structure of Rhizobiales-2 RNAs

Identifiers
- Symbol: Rhizobiales-2
- Rfam: RF01723

Other data
- RNA type: sRNA
- Domain: Hyphomicrobiales
- PDB structures: PDBe

The Rhizobiales-2 RNA motif is a set of RNAs found in certain bacteria that are presumed to be homologous because they conserve a common primary and secondary structure (see diagram). The motif was discovered using bioinformatics, and is found only within bacteria that belong to the order Hyphomicrobiales (formerly Rhizobiales), in turn a kind of alphaproteobacteria. Because Rhizobiales-2 RNAs are not consistently located in proximity to genes of a consistent class or function, these RNAs are presumed to function as non-coding RNAs.

== See also ==
- Flg-Rhizobiales RNA motif
