= PemK RNA motif =

Conserved RNA structure that was discovered by bioinformatics

pemK
- Consensus secondary structure and sequence conservation of pemK RNA

Identifiers
- Symbol: pemK
- Rfam: RF02913

Other data
- RNA type: Cis-reg
- SO: SO:0005836
- PDB structures: PDBe

The pemK RNA motif is a conserved RNA structure that was discovered by bioinformatics. pemK motif RNAs are found in organisms within the phylum Bacillota, and is very widespread in this phylum.

pemK motif RNAs likely function as cis-regulatory elements, in view of their positions upstream of protein-coding genes. Indeed, the RNAs are upstream of multiple genes that encode non-homologous proteins. If all examples of the RNA were upstream of homologous genes, there is the possibility that the RNAs were conserved in that position simply by inheritance. The non-homology of the genes downstream of pemK RNAs makes this scenario less likely.

cis-regulatory RNAs such as riboswitches in Bacillota are often followed by Rho-independent transcription terminators, and they use these transcription terminators as part of a regulatory mechanism. Specifically, depending on the regulatory state of the cis-regulatory RNA, formation of the transcription terminator is either prevented or allowed via alternate secondary structures. pemK RNAs, however, are very rarely followed by a transcription terminator. This fact could raise the possibility that these RNAs are not cis-regulatory, but rather function as small RNAs. However, there are some cis-regulatory RNAs in Bacillota that do not use Rho-independent transcription terminations as a regulatory mechanism, e.g., the yjdF RNA motif.
