= ATPC RNA motif =

Conserved RNA structure

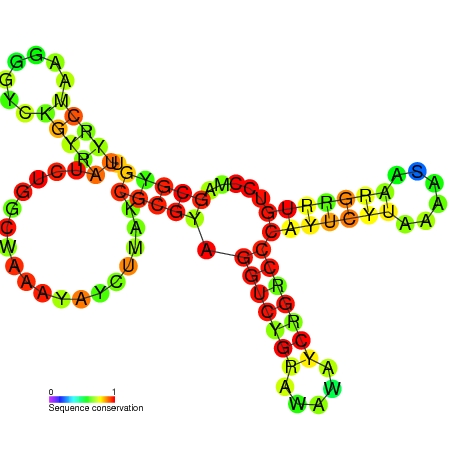
- Predicted secondary structure and sequence conservation of ATPC

Identifiers
- Symbol: ATPC
- Rfam: RF01067

Other data
- RNA type: Gene
- Domain: Bacteria
- SO: SO:0001263
- PDB structures: PDBe

The ATPC RNA motif is a conserved RNA structure found in certain cyanobacteria. It is apparently ubiquitous in Prochlorococcus marinus, and is present in many species in the genus Synechococcus. The RNA is always found within an operon encoding subunits of ATP synthase, and it is always located downstream of the gene encoding the A subunit of ATP synthase, and upstream of the C subunit gene. This location is consistent with a cis-regulatory element, but also with a non-coding RNA that is transcribed with the ATP synthase genes.

Simple RNA structures called stem-loops have been reported in the ATP synthase operons of various cyanobacteria, but not structures such as the 3-stem junction that is the main feature of the ATPC RNA motif.
