= Rhodo-rpoB RNA motif =

Rhodo-rpoB
- Consensus secondary structure and sequence conservation of Rhodo-rpoB RNA

Identifiers
- Symbol: Rhodo-rpoB
- Rfam: RF03074

Other data
- RNA type: Cis-reg
- SO: SO:0005836
- PDB structures: PDBe

The Rhodo-rpoB RNA motif is a conserved RNA structure that was discovered by bioinformatics. Rhodo-rpoB motifs are found in Rhodobacterales.

Rhodo-rpoB motif RNAs likely function as cis-regulatory elements, in view of their positions upstream of protein-coding genes. The apparently regulated genes encode subunits of RNA polymerase.
