= S-element =

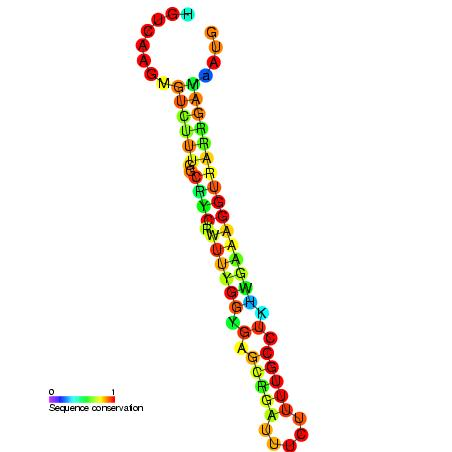
- Predicted secondary structure and sequence conservation of S-element

Identifiers
- Symbol: S-element
- Rfam: RF00490

Other data
- RNA type: Cis-reg
- Domain(s): Bacteria
- SO: SO:0000233
- PDB structures: PDBe

The S-element is an RNA element found in p42d and related plasmids. The S-element has multiple functions and is believed to act as a negative regulator of repC transcription, and be required for efficient replication and act as a translational enhancer of repC.

== See also ==
- ctRNA
