= FolP RNA motif =

folP
- Consensus secondary structure and sequence conservation of folP RNA

Identifiers
- Symbol: folP
- Rfam: RF02978

Other data
- RNA type: Cis-reg
- SO: SO:0005836
- PDB structures: PDBe

The folP RNA motif is a conserved RNA structure that was discovered by bioinformatics. folP motifs are found in the genus Dialister.

folP motif RNAs likely function as cis-regulatory elements, in view of their positions upstream of protein-coding genes. The RNAs are, in most cases, followed by Rho-independent transcription terminators, which might participate in the cis regulation performed by folP RNAs. The RNAs are upstream of genes encoding dihydropteroate synthase, which is involved in folate metabolism.
