= Tombusvirus 5′ UTR =

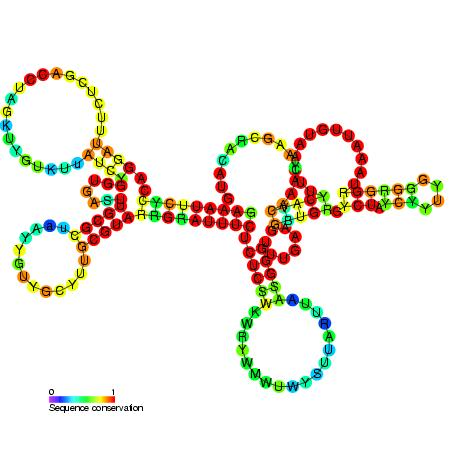
- Predicted secondary structure and sequence conservation of Tombus_5

Identifiers
- Symbol: Tombus_5
- Rfam: RF00171

Other data
- RNA type: Cis-reg
- Domain: Viruses
- SO: SO:0000204
- PDB structures: PDBe

Tombusvirus 5′ UTR is an important cis-regulatory region of the Tombus virus genome.

Tomato bushy stunt virus is the prototype member of the Tombusvirus genus in the Tombusviridae family. The genome of this virus is positive sense single stranded RNA. Replication occurs via a negative strand RNA intermediate. In addition to viral proteins p33 and the RNA-dependent RNA polymerase p92, and unknown host factors, conserved and structural regions within the 5′ untranslated region (5′ UTR) are important for regulating genome replication.

2 RNA domains in the 5′ UTR have been reported, a 5′ T-shaped domain (TSD) followed by a stem-loop (SL5) and a downstream domain (DSD). TSD-DSD interactions are proposed to be involved in the mediation of viral RNA replication.

An interesting feature of tombusviruses is its ability to support the replication of defective interfering (DI) RNAs. These sub-viral replicons are small, non-coding, deletion mutants of the viral genome that maintain cis-acting RNA elements necessary for replication

Other non-coding RNA structures in Tombusvirus include the 3′ UTR region IV and an internal replication element.
