= RbcL 5′ UTR RNA stabilising element =

Region of non-coding DNA

rbcL 5′ UTR RNA stabilising element
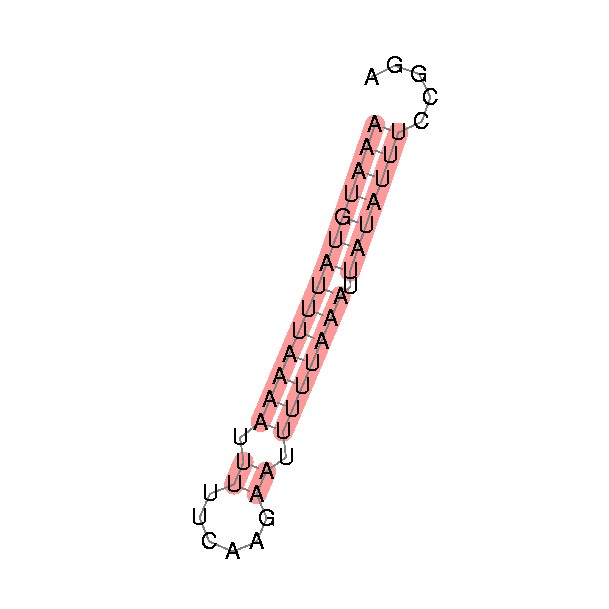

Identifiers
- Symbol: RbcL_stabil
- Rfam: RF00197

Other data
- RNA type: Cis-reg;
- PDB structures: PDBe

The rbcL 5′ UTR RNA stabilising element is an RNA element from Chlamydomonas reinhardtii that is thought to be involved in the stabilisation of the rbcL gene which codes for large subunit of ribulose-1,5-bisphosphate carboxylase. Mutations in this family can lead to a 50-fold acceleration in degradation of the mRNA transcript.
