= Enterovirus cis-acting replication element =

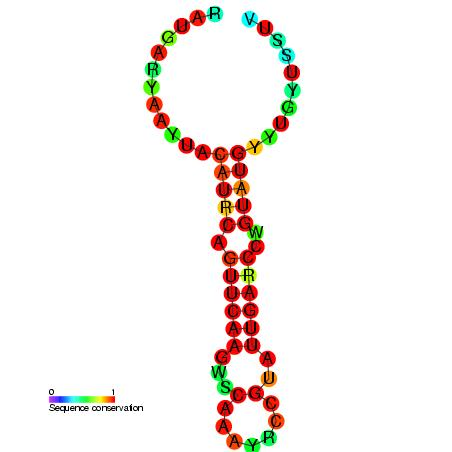
- Predicted secondary structure and sequence conservation of Entero_CRE

Identifiers
- Symbol: Entero_CRE
- Alt. Symbols: CRE
- Rfam: RF00048

Other data
- RNA type: Cis-reg
- Domain(s): Viruses
- SO: SO:0000233
- PDB structures: PDBe

Enterovirus cis-acting replication element is a small RNA hairpin in the coding region of protein 2C as the site in PV1(M) RNA that is used as the primary template for the in vitro uridylylation. The first step in the replication of the plus-stranded poliovirus RNA is the synthesis of a complementary minus strand. This process is initiated by the covalent attachment of uridine monophosphate (UMP) to the terminal protein VPg, yielding VPgpU and VPgpUpU.

== See also ==
- Enteroviral 3′ UTR element
- Enterovirus 5′ cloverleaf cis-acting replication element
