= Wingless localisation element 3 (WLE3) =

- Predicted secondary structure and sequence conservation of WLE3

Identifiers
- Symbol: WLE3
- Rfam: RF01046

Other data
- RNA type: Cis-reg
- Domain(s): Eukaryota
- SO: SO:0005836
- PDB structures: PDBe

The WL3 Wingless localisation element 3 (WLE3) is an RNA structure that localises the wingless mRNA in flies.

The structure consists of a stem, a bulge region, another stem and a loop. The published structure was determined and refined through experiments.

Wingless localisation element 3 (WLE3) is a 53-nt (nt 518–570) apical localization element within the 3'-untranslated region of the wingless (wg) mRNA. It is shown to be sufficient and necessary for apical RNA transport in microinjection assays and transgenic reporters. Indeed, deletion of WLE3 in an otherwise full-length wg 3'UTR completely abolishes apical localization. However, a minimal WLE3 monomer by itself shows weak activity on its own. The incomplete activity of a single WLE3 element indicates a requirement for additional elements or sequences.

Phylogenetic comparison of WLE3 elements predicts a highly conserved stem-loop structure in Drosophila species (using ALIFOLD) and deemed necessary for WLE function by mutational analyses.

Full WLE3 activity is dependent on appropriate downstream sequences and can also be blocked by downstream sequences. Targeted mutations on the sequence and structural aspects of WLE3 stem-loop were done and tested showing the distal stem to be most important, the central variable region while must be present its sequences and bulges appear to be unimportant and the WLE3 loop with two invariant residues is not required for localization.
