= SsnA RNA motif =

Conserved RNA structure that was discovered by bioinformatics

ssnA
- Consensus secondary structure and sequence conservation of ssnA RNA

Identifiers
- Symbol: ssnA
- Rfam: RF03031

Other data
- RNA type: Cis-reg
- SO: SO:0005836
- PDB structures: PDBe

The ssnA RNA motif is a conserved RNA structure that was discovered by bioinformatics. ssnA motif RNAs are found in Clostridiales.

ssnA motif RNAs likely function as cis-regulatory elements, in view of their positions upstream of protein-coding genes. Specifically, they occur upstream of genes that are homologous to the ssnA gene of Escherichia coli, even though ssnA RNAs are not themselves in E. coli, or related organisms. This gene's biological function is not yet known (as of 2018), but it is predicted as a type of metallo-dependent hydrolase. ssnA RNAs are closely (within 20–30 base pairs) by Rho-independent transcription terminators.
