= PsbNH RNA motif =

psbNH RNA
- Consensus secondary structure of psbNH RNAs

Identifiers
- Symbol: psbNH RNA
- Rfam: RF01753

Other data
- RNA type: Cis-regulatory element
- Domain(s): cyanobacteria
- PDB structures: PDBe

The psbNH RNA motif describes a class of RNA molecules that have a conserved secondary structure. psbNH RNAs are always found between psbH and psbH genes, both of which are involved in the cyanobacterial photosystem II are transcribed in opposite orientations. It is unknown whether the biological psbNH RNA is as depicted in the diagram, or whether its reverse complement is the transcribed molecule. In either case, the RNA would be in the 5' untranslated region of a gene, either psbN or psbH, and likely a cis-regulatory element.
