= RtT RNA =

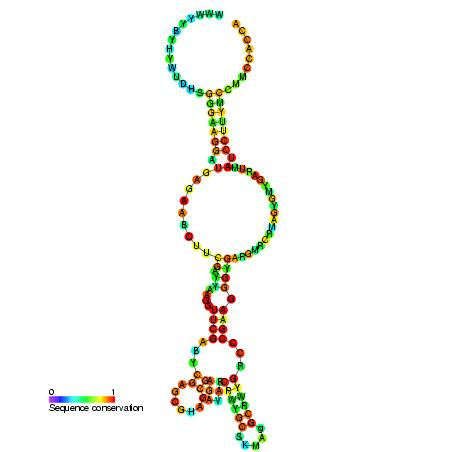
- Predicted secondary structure and sequence conservation of RtT

Identifiers
- Symbol: RtT
- Rfam: RF00391

Other data
- RNA type: Cis-reg
- Domain(s): Bacteria
- SO: SO:0000655
- PDB structures: PDBe

The RtT RNA (repeat structure of the tyrT operon) is a RNA element that is released from the tyrT operon of Escherichia coli. The exact function of RtT is unknown although it is thought that it may be involved in changing the cellular response in relation to amino acid starvation.

The functional prediction is strengthened when the tyrT locus of E. coli K12 is compared with the B strain, which lacks RtT RNA and has an alternate starvation response.
