= Vimentin 3′ UTR protein-binding region =

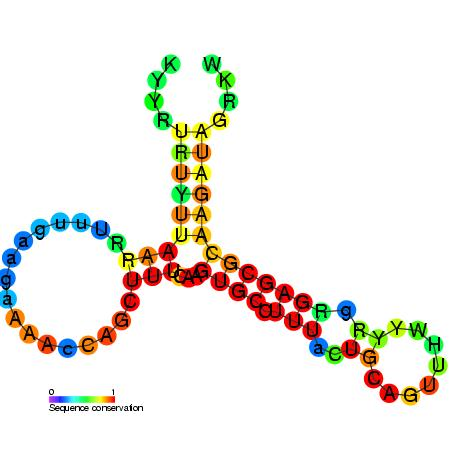
- Predicted secondary structure and sequence conservation of Vimentin3

Identifiers
- Symbol: Vimentin3
- Rfam: RF00109

Other data
- RNA type: Cis-reg
- Domain(s): Eukaryota
- SO: SO:0000205
- PDB structures: PDBe

The vimentin 3′ UTR protein-binding region is an RNA element that contains a Y-shaped structure which has been shown to have protein-binding activity. The same region has been implicated in the control of mRNA localisation to the perinuclear region of the cytoplasm, possibly at sites of intermediate filament assembly. The identity of the proteins involved and the localisation mechanism are not known.
