= XerDC RNA motif =

xerDC
- Consensus secondary structure and sequence conservation of xerDC RNA

Identifiers
- Symbol: xerDC
- Rfam: RF03062

Other data
- RNA type: Cis-reg
- SO: SO:0005836
- PDB structures: PDBe

The xerDC RNA motif is a conserved RNA structure that was discovered by bioinformatics. xerDC motif RNAs are found in Clostridia.

xerDC RNAs function as cis-regulatory elements, in view of their positions upstream of protein-coding genes.

xerDC RNAs are consistently located upstream of xerDC genes. The precise functions of the protein product of particular xerDC genes have not been established, but they are predicted to generally fit into a recombinase or integrase role. Given this genetic arrangement, it is likely that xerDC RNAs function as cis-regulatory elements. However, recombinases and integrases operate on DNA, which can sometimes be singled-stranded. Therefore, it is also possible that the xerDC motif actually operates at the level of single-stranded DNA. In terms of secondary structure, RNA and DNA are difficult to distinguish when only sequence information is available.

xerDC RNAs sometimes partially overlap predicted genes. However, these genes are relatively small and their putative protein products are not similar to any known conserved protein domain, suggesting that the genes might be false positive predictions.
