= Freshwater-2 RNA motif =

freshwater-2
- Consensus secondary structure and sequence conservation of freshwater-2 RNA

Identifiers
- Symbol: freshwater-2
- Rfam: RF02980

Other data
- RNA type: Cis-reg
- SO: SO:0005836
- PDB structures: PDBe

The freshwater-2 RNA motif is a conserved RNA structure that was discovered by bioinformatics. Freshwater-2 motif RNAs are found in metagenomic sequences that are isolated from aquatic and especially freshwater environments. As of 2018, no freshwater-2 RNA has been identified in a classified organism.

Freshwater-2 RNAs are consistently located upstream of genes that encode a conserved protein domain. However, this conserved domain is not present in current databases of protein domains. In view of their positions upstream of these protein-coding gene], freshwater-2 motif RNAs might function as cis-regulatory elements. However, another possibility is that they are part of a prophage, as phages often contain large transcripts made up of multiple genes encoded in the same DNA strand. Freshwater-2 RNAs observed as of 2018 are present in short contig sequences, which do not allow further investigation of whether they are part of a large cluster of genes in the same orientation (which would tend to suggest that they are phage small RNAs), or not (which would tend to suggest that they are cis regulatory.
