= Flaccid paralysis (shooting) =

Term used in tactical shooting

Flaccid paralysis is a term used in tactical shooting when a shot to the head is taken and the bullet enters the person's cranial cavity, in the "T-box". T-box shots are normally made in a situation where the suspect is armed and holding a hostage, usually at gun or knife point. The T-zone is a T-shaped area from the outside of one eye socket to the outside of the other eye socket and extending down the bridge of the nose to the upper lip. This area forms the "T" from which it derives its name. The bullet strikes and severs the spinal column, causing flaccid paralysis and eliminates the possibility of involuntary muscle spasms.

The advantage of flaccid paralysis is that the subject is rendered incapacitated instantaneously, preventing involuntary muscle contraction that may pull the trigger or cause other movements that may injure or kill a hostage. This is a difficult shot to make, even by more trained and experienced marksmen.
