= Chlorobi-RRM RNA motif =

Chlorobi-RRM RNA
- Consensus secondary structure of Chlorobi-RRM RNAs

Identifiers
- Symbol: Clorobi-RRM
- Rfam: RF01697

Other data
- RNA type: Cis-regulatory element
- Domain(s): Chlorobiota
- PDB structures: PDBe

The Chlorobi-RRM RNA motif is a conserved RNA structure identified by bioinformatics. It is found within bacteria in the phylum Chlorobiota (formerly Chlorobi), and is exclusively detected in the presumed 5' untranslated regions (5' UTRs) of genes that encode putative RNA-binding proteins. Since many RNA-binding proteins regulate their own expression in a feedback mechanism by binding or acting up their 5' UTR, it was proposed that the Chlorobi-RRM is a component in an analogous feedback mechanism. Structurally, the motif consists of two stem-loops, the second of which might function as a rho-independent transcription terminator.
