= NhaA-II RNA motif =

nhaA-II
- Consensus secondary structure and sequence conservation of nhaA-II RNA

Identifiers
- Symbol: nhaA-II
- Rfam: RF03038

Other data
- RNA type: Cis-reg
- SO: SO:0005836
- PDB structures: PDBe

The nhaA-II RNA motif is a conserved RNA structure that was discovered by bioinformatics. nhaA-II motifs are found in Caulobacterales.

nhaA-II motif RNAs likely function as cis-regulatory elements, in view of their positions upstream of protein-coding genes. nhaA-I RNAs typically occur upstream of genes that encode exchangers of sodium ions and protons. More rarely, they also exist upstream of methyltransferases that use S-adenosylmethionine as a donor.
