= COG3860 RNA motif =

COG3860
- Consensus secondary structure and sequence conservation of COG3860 RNA

Identifiers
- Symbol: COG3860
- Rfam: RF02940

Other data
- RNA type: Cis-reg
- SO: SO:0005836
- PDB structures: PDBe

The COG3860 RNA motif is a conserved RNA structure that was discovered by bioinformatics. COG3860 motifs are found in Alphaproteobacteria, Betaproteobacteria, and Thermodesulfobacteriota. Energetically stable tetraloops often occur in this motif.

COG3860 motif RNAs likely function as cis-regulatory elements, in view of their positions upstream of protein-coding genes. Unfortunately the functions of the putatively regulated genes are not sufficiently well known to be able to hypothesize a biological function for COG3860 RNAs.
