= DUF3085 RNA motif =

DUF3085
- Consensus secondary structure and sequence conservation of DUF3085 RNA

Identifiers
- Symbol: DUF3085
- Rfam: RF02959

Other data
- RNA type: Cis-reg
- SO: SO:0005836
- PDB structures: PDBe

The DUF3085 RNA motif is a conserved RNA structure that was discovered by bioinformatics. DUF3085 motifs are found in one species in the genus Thauera, as well as various metagenomic sequences obtained from environmental DNA.

DUF3085 motif RNAs likely function as cis-regulatory elements, in view of their positions upstream of protein-coding genes. The genes they putatively regulate often encode the DUF3085 conserved protein domain or ParB, a protein often used by plasmids. However, because DUF3085 RNAs were not found in any fully sequenced organism, it was not possible to determine if DUF3085 RNAs are consistently located in plasmids.
