= Cap-independent translation element =

RNA sequence found in some plant viruses

In molecular biology, a cap-independent translation element (CITE or 3'CITE) is an RNA sequence found in the 3'UTR of many RNA plant viruses.

Eukaryotic mRNAs contain a 5' cap structure which is required for efficient binding of translation initiation factors. Many viral mRNAs lack the 5' cap, animal virus mRNAs often contain an internal ribosome entry site which functions in translation initiation. Many plant viral mRNAs contain a cap-independent translation element. These elements mediate initiation of translation of the proteins encoded in the mRNA by either recruiting translation initiation factors or the 60S ribosomal subunit to the viral RNA. In RNA2 of Red clover necrotic mosaic virus (RCNMV) the cap-independent translation element is required for negative strand RNA synthesis.

There are many different structural classes of cap-independent translation element, with no apparent structural or sequence similarity:

Structure	Example species
TED (translation enhancer domain)	Satellite tobacco necrosis virus (STNV)
BTE (BYDV-like translation element)	Barley yellow dwarf virus (BYDV)
PTE (PMV-like translation element)	Panicum mosaic virus (PMV)
TSS (T-shaped structure)	Turnip crinkle virus (TCV)
Y-shaped	Tomato bushy stunt virus (TBSV)
I-shaped	Maize necrotic streak virus (MNeSV)

== See also ==
- Luteovirus cap-independent translation element (BTE)
