= Flg-Rhizobiales RNA motif =

flg-Rhizobiales RNA motif
- Consensus secondary structure of flg-Rhizobiales RNAs

Identifiers
- Symbol: flg-Rhizobiales
- Rfam: RF01736

Other data
- RNA type: Cis-regulatory element
- Domain(s): Hyphomicrobiales
- PDB structures: PDBe

The flg-Rhizobiales RNA motif is an RNA structure that is conserved in certain bacteria. All known flg-Rhizobiales RNAs are located in the presumptive 5' untranslated regions of operons that contain genes whose functions relate to the creation of flagellar basal bodies. The flg-Rhizobiales RNAs are restricted to the Hyphomicrobiales (formerly known as Rhizobiales), an order of alphaproteobacteria, although only some Rhizobiales bacterial are predicted to use flg-Rhizobiales RNAs. The exact function of these RNAs is unknown, although it is hypothesized that they have a cis-regulatory function in controlling expression of the downstream operons.

== See also ==
- Rhizobiales-2 RNA motif
