= Regulatory region of repZ gene =

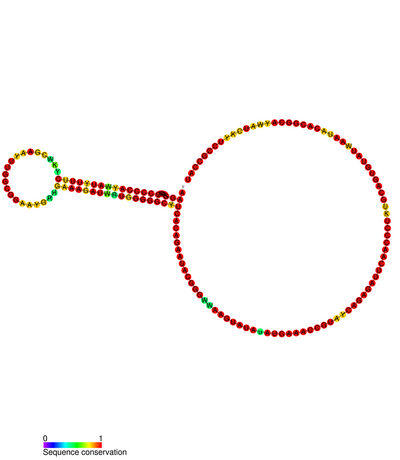
- Secondary structure of the regulatory region of repZ gene

Identifiers
- Symbol: repZ
- Rfam: RF01087

Other data
- RNA type: Cis-reg
- Domain(s): Pseudomonadota
- PDB structures: PDBe

The regulatory region of the repZ gene, which encodes the replication initiator of plasmid ColIb-P9, contains a pseudoknot. This acts as a molecular switch controlling translation of repZ and repY.
