= Board of Technical Education, Delhi =

Board Of Technical Education Delhi
- Established: 1958
- Director: v.p rao
- Location: Delhi, Delhi, India
- Campus: Urban
- Affiliations: UGC, AICTE
- Website: www.delhi.gov.in/wps/wcm/connect/doit_tt/Training+and+Technical+Education/Home/Board+of+Technical+Education

The Board of Technical Education, Delhi (BTEDELHI or DELHIBTE) is the board which provides technical education to students in Delhi, India after completing their Junior Engineers Course. The course is a three-year programme also called the three year diploma. Students must have completed high school.

BTEDELHI is mostly affiliated with government colleges and a few private colleges. There are over 30 trades offered in Group A including computer science, IT, mechanical, electrical, electronics, automobile, civil and tool and die engineering. There are more than 20 colleges affiliated with BTEDELHI that offer courses in Group A.

Other groups offer programmes in textiles, home science, agriculture, and others.

== Organization ==
DELHI BTE has three type of institutions:

- Government Institutions
  - Aryabhatt Institute of Technology
  - Rao Tula Ram College of Technical Education
  - Pusa Institute of Technology
  - Ambedkar Polytechnic
  - Delhi Institute of Tool Engineering (DITE)
  - G.B. Pant Institute of Technology
  - Guru Nanak Dev Institute of Technology
  - Kasturba Institute of Technology, Kasturba Polytechnic for Women was founded in 1986 and is affiliated to AICTE, Govt of India.
  - Meerabai Institute of Technology
  - Institute of Basic Business Studies, Pusa
  - ITI Mangolpuri, Delhi
  - World Class Skill Centre, Delhi
  - ITI Khichripur, Mayur Vihar, Delhi
  - ITI Nand Nagri, Delhi
  - ITI Pusa, Delhi
  - ITI Sir C.V. Raman, Dheerpur, Delhi
  - ITI (W), Mori Gate Gokhle Road, Delhi
  - ITI Malviya Nagar, Delhi
  - ITI Jaffarpur, Delhi
  - ITI for Women Vivek Vihar, Delhi
  - ITI Veer Savarkar Basic Training Centre Pusa, Delhi
  - ITI Lala Hans Raj Gupta, Delhi
  - ITI Tilak Nagar, New Delhi
  - ITI Siri Fort (W) New Delhi
  - ITI Jail Road Hari Nagar, Delhi
  - ITI Jahangirpuri
  - ITI Arab Ki Sarai Nizamuddin, Delhi
  - ITI Shahdara
- Aided Institutions
- Private Institutions
