= N-myc internal ribosome entry site (IRES) =

n-myc internal ribosome entry site (IRES)
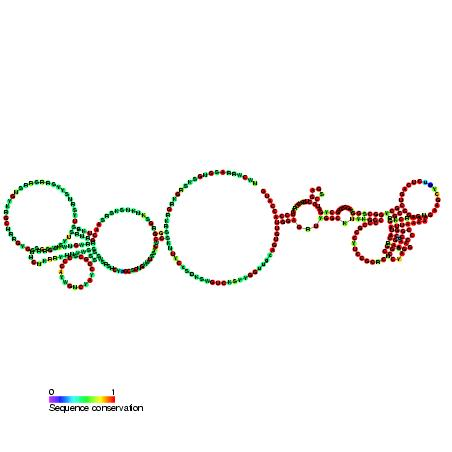
- Predicted secondary structure and sequence conservation of IRES_n-myc

Identifiers
- Symbol: IRES_n-myc
- Alt. Symbols: n-myc_IRES
- Rfam: RF00226

Other data
- RNA type: Cis-reg; IRES
- Domain(s): Eukaryota
- GO: GO:0043022
- SO: SO:0000243
- PDB structures: PDBe

The N-myc internal ribosome entry site (IRES) is an RNA element found in the n-myc gene. The myc family of genes when expressed are known to be involved in the control of cell growth, differentiation and apoptosis. n-myc mRNA has an alternative method of translation via an internal ribosome entry site where ribosomes are recruited to the IRES located in the 5' UTR thus bypassing the typical eukaryotic cap-dependent translation pathway.

== See also ==
- Mnt IRES
- Tobamovirus IRES
- TrkB IRES
