= PyrG leader =

In molecular biology, the PyrG leader is a cis-regulatory RNA element found at the 5' of the PyrG mRNA. The PyrG gene encodes a CTP synthase, which is involved in pyrimidine biosynthesis. The PyrG leader regulates expression of PyrG, PyrG can form into two different hairpin structures, a terminator or an anti-terminator. Under low CTP conditions, guanine (G) residues are incorporated at a specific site within the PyrG leader, these allow base-pairing with a uracil (U)-rich region and the formation of an anti-terminator loop, this results in increased expression of PyrG. Under high CTP conditions the guanines are not added, the anti-terminator loop cannot form and instead a terminator loop is formed, preventing further PyrG expression.
