= Plasmid RNAIII =

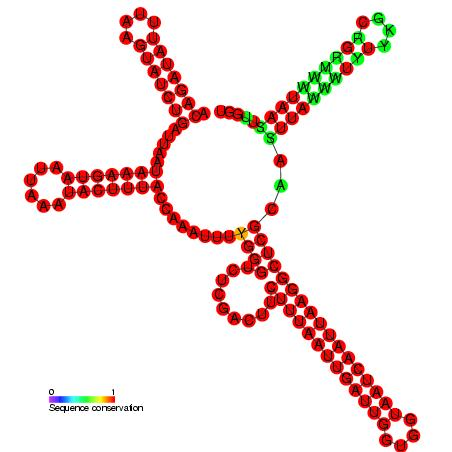
- Predicted secondary structure and sequence conservation of Plasmid_RNAIII

Identifiers
- Symbol: Plasmid_RNAIII
- Rfam: RF00235

Other data
- RNA type: Gene
- Domain(s): Bacteria
- SO: SO:0000233
- PDB structures: PDBe

Plasmid RNAIII is a non-coding RNA found in bacterial plasmids including pIP501. RNAIII acts by transcriptional attenuation of the essential repR-mRNA. RNAIII is composed of four stem-loops with loops L3 and L4 that interact with the RNA target.
