= HIV gag stem loop 3 (GSL3) =

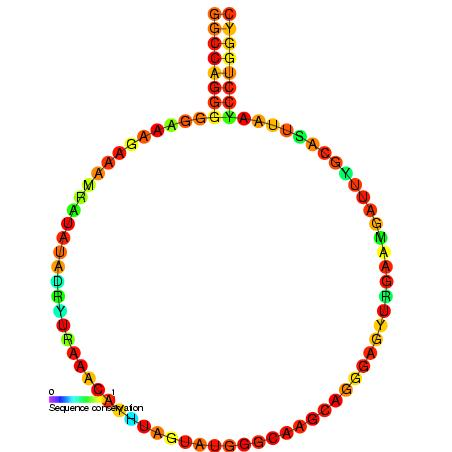
- Predicted secondary structure and sequence conservation of HIV_GSL3

Identifiers
- Symbol: HIV_GSL3
- Rfam: RF00376

Other data
- RNA type: Cis-reg
- Domain(s): Viruses
- SO: SO:0000233
- PDB structures: PDBe

HIV gag stem loop 3 (GSL3) is a secondary structural component of the Retroviral Psi packaging element, also known as the psi recognition element. This domain plays a major role in RNA packaging and is located the 5’ untranslated region of the unspliced HIV-1 genome. GSL3 is known to direct specific packaging of HIV-1 genomic RNA. While deletion of GSL3 leads to decreases in both viral RNA packaging and dimerization, mutagenic studies have shown that it does not eliminate encapsulation of retroviral RNA.

== Pharmaceutical Advancements ==
=== Interaction with NCp7 ===
RNA encapsulation involves detection of the psi recognition element by the protein NCp7. NCp7 contains two successive zinc fingers which are linked by a stretch of basic residues. Their function is to activate annealing of primer tRNA to the initiation site (where reverse transcription occurs). During this process, GSL3 interacts with NCp7 specifically. Current pharmaceuticals utilized for HIV/AIDS treatment inhibit fundamental processes in the replication cycle of the retrovirus. This interaction is a potential point of inhibition.

=== Inhibitory Ligands ===
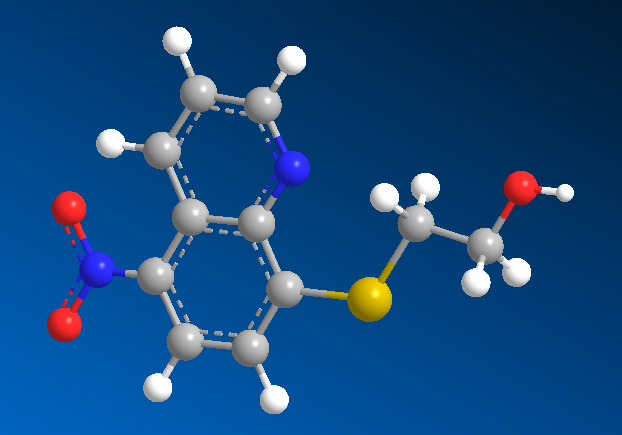
An example of a lead compound. See for additional information

Inhibitor development remains in an early phase. The challenge of synthesizing a compound with a simple molecular structure and low molecular weight in order to limit side interactions and the existence potentially detrimental stereoisomers requires both a computational and high-throughput approach. 2-((5-nitroquinolin-8-yl)thio)ethanol, a potential lead compound, is shown at right. It is selective for the loop structure of GSL3 over double and single stranded RNA. This implies that if released in a cell targeted by HIV, it would block the stem-loop and thus limit productive interaction with NCp7.
