= DABA-DC-AT RNA motif =

DABA-DC-AT
- Consensus secondary structure and sequence conservation of DABA-DC-AT RNA

Identifiers
- Symbol: DABA-DC-AT
- Rfam: RF02951

Other data
- RNA type: Cis-reg
- SO: SO:0005836
- PDB structures: PDBe

The DABA-DC-AT RNA motif is a conserved RNA structure that was discovered by bioinformatics. DABA-DC-AT motifs are found in Gammaproteobacteria, but overwhelmingly in the order Vibrionales.

DABA-DC-AT motif RNAs likely function as cis-regulatory elements, in view of their positions upstream of protein-coding genes. These genes include those encoding L-2,4-diaminobutyrate decarboxylase (DABA-DC), L-2,4-diaminobutyrate aminotransferase (DABA-AT) and carboxynorspermidine decarboxylase. Vibrio cholerae, one of the organisms with a DABA-DC-AT RNA, is known to synthesize nor-spermidine, and it is possible that the regulated genes are part of a pathway to synthesize this metabolite.

Structurally, the motif consists of four hairpins, of which only one is well supported by covariation evidence. Thus, although there is strong evidence that the motif corresponds to a biological RNA, the precise structure remains unclear.
