= LysM RNA motifs =

lysM RNA motifs are conserved RNA structures that were discovered by bioinformatics. Such bacterial motifs are defined by consistently being upstream of 'lysM' genes, which encode lysin protein domains, a conserved domain that participates in cell wall degradation. lysM motif RNAs likely function as cis-regulatory elements, in view of their positions upstream of protein-coding genes, although this hypothesis is not certain.

Three lysM RNA motifs have been found. lysM-Actino motif RNAs are found in Actinomycetales. lysM-Prevotella motif RNAs are found in the genus Prevotella. The lysM-TM7 RNA motif occurs only in the poorly understood phylum TM7.

A part of the lysM-Actino motif is likely the Shine-Dalgarno sequence of the downstream lysM gene. Thus, these RNAs might regulate the downstream gene translationally.
