= Enteroviral 3′ UTR element =

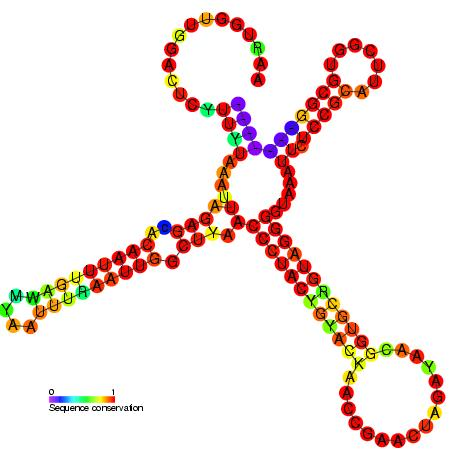
- Predicted secondary structure and sequence conservation of Entero_OriR

Identifiers
- Symbol: Entero_OriR
- Rfam: RF00041

Other data
- RNA type: Cis-reg
- Domain(s): Viruses
- SO: SO:0000205
- PDB structures: PDBe

In molecular biology, the enteroviral 3′ UTR element is an RNA structure found in the 3′ UTR of various enteroviruses. The overall structure forms the origin of replication (OriR) for the initiation of (-) strand RNA synthesis. Pseudoknots have also been predicted in this structure.

== See also ==
- Enterovirus 5′ cloverleaf cis-acting replication element
- Enterovirus cis-acting replication element
