= Tombusvirus internal replication element (IRE) =

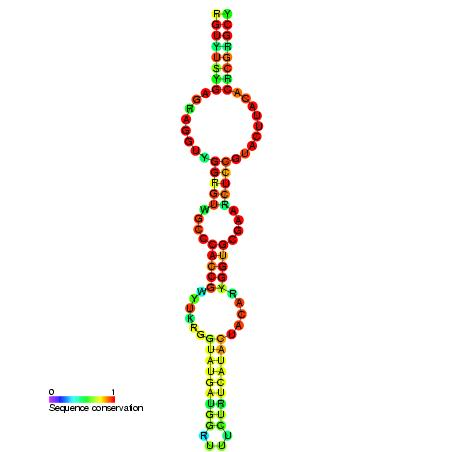
- Predicted secondary structure and sequence conservation of Tombus_IRE

Identifiers
- Symbol: Tombus_IRE
- Rfam: RF00510

Other data
- RNA type: Cis-reg
- Domain(s): Viruses
- SO: SO:0000233
- PDB structures: PDBe

In virology, the tombusvirus internal replication element (IRE) is a segment of RNA located within the region coding for p92 polymerase. This element is essential for viral replication; specifically, it is thought to be required at an early stage of replication, such as template recruitment and/or replicase complex assembly.

Other non-coding RNA structures in Tombusvirus include the 3' UTR region IV and 5' UTR.
