= Actino-pnp RNA motif =

Conserved RNA structure

Actino-pnp RNA
- Consensus secondary structure of Actino-pnp RNAs

Identifiers
- Symbol: Actino-pnp
- Rfam: RF01688

Other data
- Domain(s): Bacteria
- SO: 0005836
- PDB structures: PDBe

The Actino-pnp RNA motif is a conserved structure found in Actinomycetota that is apparently in the 5' untranslated regions of genes predicted to encode exoribonucleases. The RNA element's function is likely analogous to an RNA structure found upstream of polynucleotide phosphorylase genes in E. coli and related enterobacteria. In this latter system, the polynucleotide phosphorlyase gene regulates its own expression levels by a feedback mechanism that involves its activity upon the RNA structure. However, the E. coli RNA appears to be structurally unrelated to the Actino-pnp motif.
