= L17DE RNA motif =

L17 ribosomal protein downstream element
- Consensus secondary structure of L17 downstream element RNAs

Identifiers
- Symbol: L17DE
- Rfam: RF1708

Other data
- RNA type: Cis-regulatory element
- Domain: bacteria
- PDB structures: PDBe

The L17 downstream element RNA motif (also called L17DE) is a conserved RNA structure identified in bacteria by bioinformatics. All known L17 downstream elements were detected immediately downstream of genes encoding the L17 subunit of the ribosome, and therefore might be in the 3' untranslated regions (3' UTRs) of these genes. The element is found in a variety of lactic acid bacteria and in the genus Listeria.

Ribosomal protein leader RNAs in bacteria are found upstream of genes encoding ribosomal subunits, i.e., in their 5' untranslated regions. They bind the protein encoded by the adjacent gene, and are part of a feedback mechanism to regulate the abundance of the relevant ribosomal subunit proteins. Although regulation of an upstream gene is rare in bacteria, the L17 downstream element is positioned so as to perform feedback regulation from the 3' UTR.

An RNA transcript overlapping was detected by microarray experiments that overlaps a predicted L17 downstream element RNA. The overlapping RNA was called SR79100.
