= NLPC-P60 RNA motif =

NLPC-P60
- Consensus secondary structure and sequence conservation of NLPC-P60 RNA

Identifiers
- Symbol: NLPC-P60
- Rfam: RF03033

Other data
- RNA type: Cis-reg
- SO: SO:0005836
- PDB structures: PDBe

The NLPC-P60 RNA motif is a conserved RNA structure that was discovered by bioinformatics. NLPC-P60 motif RNAs are found in Streptomyces.

NLPC-P60 motif RNAs likely function as cis-regulatory elements, in view of their positions upstream of protein-coding genes. The RNAs are consistently located upstream of genes encoding examples of the conserved protein domain known as "NlpC/P60". The biochemical function of this domain is unknown, but it is found in lipoproteins. NlpC/P60 proteins have been related with plant-bacteria interactions. Additionally, genes encoding this domain are often regulated by riboswitches that sense the signaling molecule cyclic di-AMP. However, no association between the NLPC-P60 RNA motif and cyclic di-AMP has been established.
