= Tobamovirus internal ribosome entry site (IRES) =

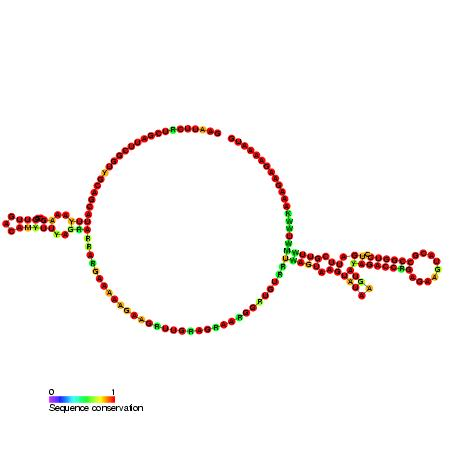
- Predicted secondary structure and sequence conservation of IRES_Tobamo

Identifiers
- Symbol: IRES_Tobamo
- Alt. Symbols: Tobamo_IRES
- Rfam: RF00225

Other data
- RNA type: Cis-reg; IRES
- Domain(s): Viruses
- GO: GO:0043022
- SO: SO:0000243
- PDB structures: PDBe

The Tobamovirus internal ribosome entry site (IRES) is an element that allows cap and end-independent translation of mRNA in the host cell. The IRES achieves this by mediating the internal initiation of translation by recruiting a ribosomal 43S pre-initiation complex directly to the initiation codon and eliminates the requirement for the eukaryotic initiation factor, eIF4F.

== See also ==
- Mnt IRES
- N-myc IRES
- TrkB IRES
