= TrkB IRES =

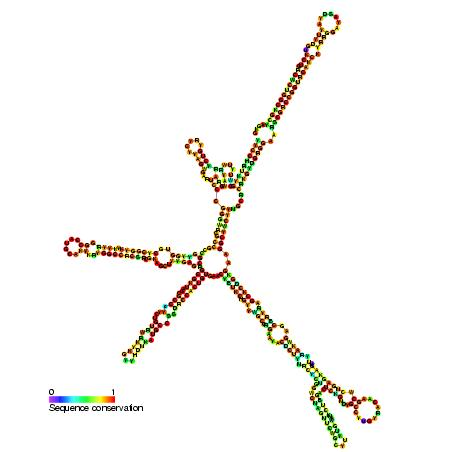
- Predicted secondary structure and sequence conservation of IRES_TrkB

Identifiers
- Symbol: IRES_TrkB
- Rfam: RF00547

Other data
- RNA type: Cis-reg; IRES
- Domain(s): Eukaryota
- GO: GO:0043022
- SO: SO:0000243
- PDB structures: PDBe

The TrkB internal ribosome entry site (IRES) is an RNA element which is present in the 5' UTR sequence of the mRNA. TrkB is a neurotrophin receptor which is essential for the development and maintenance of the nervous system. The internal ribosome entry site IRES element allows cap-independent translation of TrkB which may be needed for efficient translation in neuronal dendrites.

== See also ==
- Mnt IRES
- N-myc IRES
- Tobamovirus IRES
