= DUF3577 RNA motif =

DUF3577
- Consensus secondary structure and sequence conservation of DUF3577 RNA

Identifiers
- Symbol: DUF3577
- Rfam: RF02954

Other data
- RNA type: Cis-reg
- SO: SO:0005836
- PDB structures: PDBe

The DUF3577 RNA motif is a conserved RNA structure that was discovered by bioinformatics. DUF3577 motifs are found in the organism Cardiobacterium valvarum and metagenomic sequences from unknown organisms.

DUF3577 motif RNAs likely function as cis-regulatory elements, in view of their positions upstream of protein-coding genes. Most of these genes are not classified as encoding conserved protein domains. However, some encode the DUF3577 or DUF39 domain. The functions of these domains are not known. Many DUF3577 RNAs are located 5′ to Rho-independent transcription terminators, which, in turn, are 5′ to the start codon of the downstream gene. These transcription terminators could play a role in the regulatory function of the RNA, although transcription terminators are also often found 3′ to small RNAs that are transcribed independently from downstream genes.
