= NuoG RNA motif =

nuoG RNA
- Consensus secondary structure of nuoG RNAs

Identifiers
- Symbol: nuoG RNA
- Rfam: RF01748

Other data
- RNA type: Cis-regulatory element
- Domain(s): Enterobacteria
- PDB structures: PDBe

The nuoG RNA motif is a conserved RNA structure detected by bioinformatics. It is located in the presumed 5' untranslated regions of nuoG genes. This gene and the downstream genes probably comprise an operon that encodes various subunits of ubiquinone reductase enzyme.

nuoG RNAs are found only in some, but not all, enterobacteria. There is a question of whether sequences in the genus Salmonella correspond to nuoG RNAs that do not conserve the proposed secondary structure. If so, this observation would undermine the proposed conserved structure. However, the similarity in sequence between the recognized nuoG RNAs and the Salmonella sequences is loose, and so the sequences might be unrelated. Because of the question of the Salmonella sequences, some ambiguity remains as to whether or not nuoG RNAs do, in fact, function as structured RNAs.
