= Tombusvirus 3′ UTR region IV =

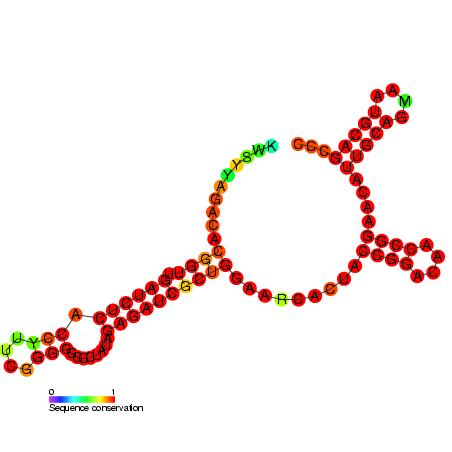
- Predicted secondary structure and sequence conservation of Tombus_3_IV

Identifiers
- Symbol: Tombus_3_IV
- Rfam: RF00176

Other data
- RNA type: Cis-reg
- Domain(s): Viruses
- SO: SO:0000205
- PDB structures: PDBe

Tombusvirus 3′ UTR is an important cis-regulatory region of the Tombus virus genome.

Tomato bushy stunt virus is the prototype member of the family Tombusviridae. The genome of this virus is positive sense single stranded RNA. Replication occurs via a negative strand RNA intermediate. In addition to viral proteins p33 and the RNA-dependent RNA polymerase p92, and unknown host factors, conserved and structural regions within the 3′ untranslated region (3′ UTR) are important for regulating genome replication. This 3′ structural element contains a pseudoknot.

Other non-coding RNA structures in Tombusvirus include the 5′ UTR and an internal replication element.
