= AtoC RNA motif =

Conserved RNA-like structure

atoC RNA
- Consensus secondary structure of atoC RNAs

Identifiers
- Symbol: atoC
- Rfam: RF01733

Other data
- RNA type: cis-regulatory element
- Domain(s): deltaproteobacteria
- PDB structures: PDBe

The atoC RNA motif is a conserved RNA-like structure identified by bioinformatics. It consistently appears upstream of protein-coding gene that are predicted to encode oxidoreductase activity, dihydropteroate synthase (part of folate metabolism) or DNA-binding response regulators.
