= LivK RNA motif =

Conserved RNA structure

livK RNA
- Consensus secondary structure of livK RNAs. This figure is adapted from a previous publication.

Identifiers
- Symbol: livK
- Rfam: RF01744

Other data
- RNA type: Cis-reg;
- Domain(s): Bacteria;
- SO: SO:0005836
- PDB structures: PDBe

The livK RNA motif describes a conserved RNA structure that was discovered using bioinformatics. The livK motif is detected only in the species Pseudomonas syringae. It is found in the potential 5' untranslated regions (5' UTRs) of livK genes and downstream livM and livH genes, as well as the 5' UTRs of amidase genes. The liv genes are predicted to be transporters of branched-chain amino acids, i.e., leucine, isoleucine or valine. The specific reaction catalyzed the amidase genes is not predicted.
