= IlvB-OMG RNA motif =

ilvB-OMG
- Consensus secondary structure and sequence conservation of ilvB-OMG RNA

Identifiers
- Symbol: ilvB-OMG
- Rfam: RF02919

Other data
- RNA type: Cis-reg
- SO: SO:0005836
- PDB structures: PDBe

The ilvB-OMG RNA motif is a conserved RNA structure that was discovered by bioinformatics. ilvB-OMG motif RNAs are found in Gammaproteobacteria within the poorly studied OMG group (Microbiology).

ilvB-OMG RNAs are found upstream of genes whose protein products are involved in synthesis of branched-chain amino acids. The motif could, therefore, function as a cis-regulatory element.
