= UnaL2 LINE 3′ element =

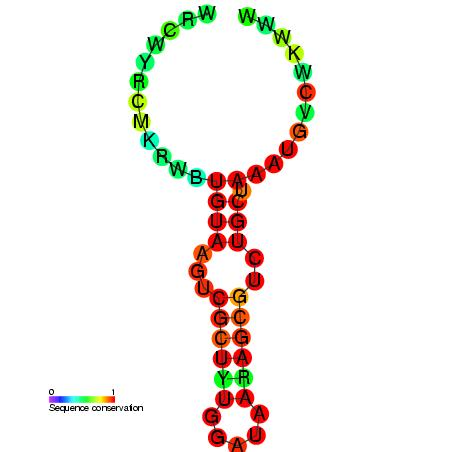
- Predicted secondary structure and sequence conservation of UnaL2

Identifiers
- Symbol: UnaL2
- Rfam: RF00436

Other data
- RNA type: Cis-reg
- Domain(s): Eukaryota
- SO: SO:0000233
- PDB structures: PDBe

The UnaL2 LINE 3′ element is an RNA element found in the UnaL2 LINE (long interspersed nuclear element) and partner SINE (short interspersed nuclear element) from eel. This conserved element is a stem-loop that is critical for their retrotransposition found in their 3′ end. The first step of retrotransposition is the recognition of their 3′ tails by UnaL2-encoded reverse transcriptase. The NMR structure of a 17-nucleotide RNA derived from the 3′ tail of UnaL2 has been determined.
