= U1A polyadenylation inhibition element (PIE) =

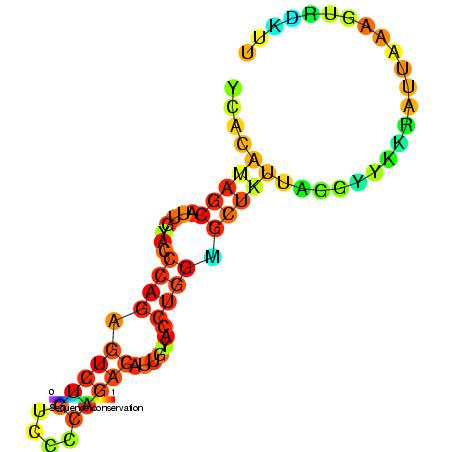
- Predicted secondary structure and sequence conservation of U1A_PIE

Identifiers
- Symbol: U1A_PIE
- Rfam: RF00460

Other data
- RNA type: Cis-reg
- Domain(s): Eukaryota
- SO: SO:0005836
- PDB structures: PDBe

The U1A polyadenylation inhibition element (PIE) is an RNA element which is responsible for the regulation of the length of the polyA tail of the U1A protein pre-mRNA. The PIE is located in the U1A mRNA 3' UTR. PIE adopts a U-shaped structure, with binding sites for a single U1A protein at each bend and when complexed with the two proteins it blocks activity of poly(A) polymerase (PAP), and inhibits its activity.
