= 6C RNA =

Class of non-coding RNA present in actinomycetes

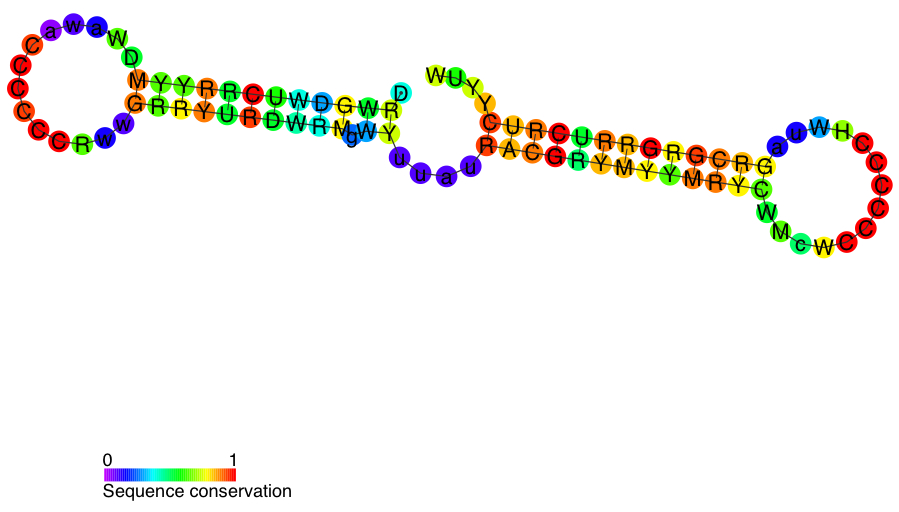
- Predicted secondary structure and sequence conservation of 6C RNA

Identifiers
- Symbol: 6C
- Rfam: RF01066

Other data
- RNA type: Cis-reg
- Domain(s): Bacteria
- SO: SO:0005836
- PDB structures: PDBe

6C RNA is a class of non-coding RNA present in actinomycetes. 6C RNA was originally discovered as a conserved RNA structure having two stem-loops each containing six or more cytosine (C) residues. Later work revealed that 6C RNAs in Streptomyces coelicolor and Streptomyces avermitilis have predicted rho-independent transcription terminators, and microarray and reverse-transcriptase PCR experiments indicate that the S. coelicolor version is transcribed as RNA. Transcription of the S. coelicolor RNA increases during sporulation, and three transcripts were detected that overlap the 6C motif, but have different apparent start and stop sites.

Additional work established that 6C RNAs regulate a variety of protein-coding genes by acting as trans-acting antisense RNAs. Among the genes regulated by 6C RNAs, many are involved in DNA replication and the export of proteins. Bacteria in other studied phyla such as Pseudomonadota and Bacillota use proteins such as Hfq that facilitate antisense RNA interactions, but 6C RNAs do not appear to depend on homologs of Hfq or other proteins. This lack of protein dependence might be typical of gram-positive bacteria whose genomes have high GC-content, of which actinomycetes are a prominent example.
