= LdcC RNA motif =

The ldcC RNA motif is a conserved RNA structure that was discovered by bioinformatics. ldcC motif RNAs are found in Bacillota and two species of Spirochaetota.

ldcC motif RNAs likely function as cis-regulatory elements, in view of their positions upstream of protein-coding genes. The genes presumably regulated by ldcC RNAs are decarboxylases of arginine, ornithine, S-adenosylmethionine or other substrates. Endopeptidase C39A and potA (a transporter of spermidine/putrescine) is also relatively common. Thus, ldcC RNAs could regulate polyamine metabolism.

The ldcC motif might have a pseudoknot in its secondary structure, but it is unclear.
