= FlpD RNA motif =

flpD RNS motif
- Consensus secondary structure of flpD RNAs

Identifiers
- Symbol: flpD RNA
- Rfam: RF01737

Other data
- RNA type: Cis-regulatory element
- Domain(s): Archaea
- PDB structures: PDBe

The flpD RNA motif is a conserved RNA structure discovered using bioinformatics. It is detected only in methanogenic archaea, and is generally located in the apparent 5' untranslated region of genes encoding hydrogenases that are likely involved in methane metabolism. For example, the flpD gene itself encodes a subunit of methyl-viologen-reducing hydrogenase.
