= Hya RNA motif =

Type of RNA structure

hya
- Consensus secondary structure and sequence conservation of hya RNA

Identifiers
- Symbol: hya
- Rfam: RF02992

Other data
- RNA type: Cis-reg
- SO: SO:0005836
- PDB structures: PDBe

The hya RNA motif is a conserved RNA structure that was discovered by bioinformatics. hya motif RNAs are found in Actinomycetota.

hya motif RNAs likely function as cis-regulatory elements, in view of their positions upstream of protein-coding genes. Indeed, the RNAs are upstream of multiple genes that encode non-homologous proteins. If all examples of the RNA were upstream of homologous genes, there is the possibility that the RNAs were conserved in that position simply by inheritance. The non-homology of the genes downstream of hya RNAs makes this scenario less likely. The genes presumably regulated by hya RNAs are subunits of nickel-iron hydrogenase I.
