= Hepatitis C virus stem-loop VII =

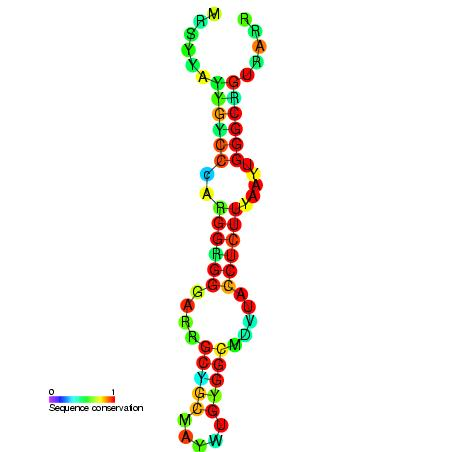
- Predicted secondary structure and sequence conservation of HCV_SLVII

Identifiers
- Symbol: HCV_SLVII
- Rfam: RF00468

Other data
- RNA type: Cis-reg
- Domain(s): Viruses
- SO: SO:0000233
- PDB structures: PDBe

Hepatitis C virus stem-loop VII is a regulatory element found in the coding region of the RNA-dependent RNA polymerase gene, NS5B. Similarly to stem-loop IV, the stem-loop structure is important (but not essential) for colony formation, though its exact function and mechanism are unknown.

== See also ==
- Hepatitis C alternative reading frame stem-loop
- Hepatitis C virus (HCV) cis-acting replication element (CRE)
- Hepatitis C virus 3'X element
