= MalK RNA motifs =

malK RNA motifs are conserved RNA structures that were discovered by bioinformatics. They are defined by being consistently located upstream of malK genes, which encode an ATPase that is used by transporters whose ligand is likely a kind of sugar. Most of these genes are annotated either as transporting maltose or glycerol-3-phosphate, however the substrate of the transporters associated with malK motif RNAs has not been experimentally determined. All known types of malK RNA motif are generally located nearby to the Shine-Dalgarno sequence of the downstream gene.

Given their positions upstream of genes and proximal to Shine-Dalgarno sequences, malK RNA motifs likely function as cis-regulatory elements, to regulate their associated malK genes. It is possible that they bind a sugar directly, and therefore function as riboswitches, but it is equally possible that regulation is mediated via a protein factor, or some other mechanism.

Three class of malK RNA motif have been found, and each class exhibits a completely unrelated structure, in terms of different conserved sequence features and a different conserved secondary structure. malK-I motifs are found in Clostridia, while malK-II motifs are found in organisms within the genus Vibrio. malK-III motifs have not yet (as of 2018) been identified in any classified organism but are known only from sequences isolated from metagenomic environmental samples.
