= FolE RNA motif =

folE
- Consensus secondary structure and sequence conservation of folE RNA

Identifiers
- Symbol: folE
- Rfam: RF02977

Other data
- RNA type: Cis-reg
- SO: SO:0005836
- PDB structures: PDBe

The folE RNA motif, now known as the THF-II riboswitch, is a conserved RNA structure that was discovered by bioinformatics. folE motifs are found in Alphaproteobacteria.

folE motif RNAs likely function as cis-regulatory elements, in view of their positions upstream of protein-coding genes. Instances of the folE RNA motif are often located nearby to the predicted Shine-Dalgarno sequence of the downstream gene. This arrangement is consistent with a model of cis-regulation where the RNA allosterically controls access to the Shine-Dalgarno sequence, thus regulating the gene translationally. All known folE RNAs are present upstream of genes encoding GTP cyclohydrolase I, which performs a step in folate metabolism.

folE RNAs have been shown to bind tetrahydrofolate and related molecules, leading to their designation as a second structural class of tetrahydrofolate riboswitches, called THF-II riboswitches.
