= SucC RNA motif =

sucC RNA motif
- Consensus secondary structure of sucC RNAs

Identifiers
- Symbol: sucC RNA
- Rfam: RF01759

Other data
- RNA type: Cis-regulatory region
- Domain(s): Pseudomonas
- PDB structures: PDBe

The sucC RNA motif is a conserved RNA structure discovered using bioinformatics. sucC RNAs are found in the genus Pseudomonas. They ae consistently found in possible 5' untranslated regions of sucC genes. These genes encode Succinyl coenzyme A synthetase, and are hypothesised to be regulated by the sucC RNAs. sucC genes participate in the citric acid cycle, and another gene involved in the citric acid cycle, sucA, is also predicted to be regulated by a conserved RNA structure (see sucA RNA motif and sucA-II RNA motif).
