= Citrus tristeza virus replication signal =

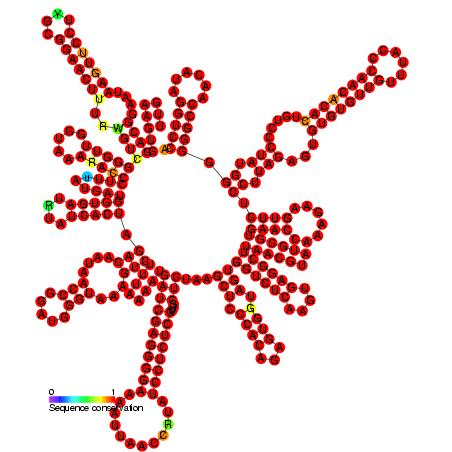
- Predicted secondary structure and sequence conservation of CTV_rep_sig

Identifiers
- Symbol: CTV_rep_sig
- Rfam: RF00193

Other data
- RNA type: Cis-reg
- Domain(s): Viruses
- SO: SO:0000233
- PDB structures: PDBe

The Citrus tristeza virus replication signal is a regulatory element involved in a viral replication signal which is highly conserved in citrus tristeza viruses. Replication signals are required for viral replication and are usually found near the 5' and 3' termini of protein coding genes. This element is predicted to form ten stem loop structures some of which are essential for functions that provide for efficient viral replication.

== See also ==
- Cardiovirus cis-acting replication element (CRE)
- Coronavirus SL-III cis-acting replication element (CRE)
- Heron HBV RNA encapsidation signal epsilon
