= Peptidase-S11 RNA motif =

Peptidase-S11
- Consensus secondary structure and sequence conservation of Peptidase-S11 RNA

Identifiers
- Symbol: Peptidase-S11
- Rfam: RF03039

Other data
- RNA type: Cis-reg
- SO: SO:0005836
- PDB structures: PDBe

The Peptidase-S11 RNA motif is a conserved RNA structure that was discovered by bioinformatics. Peptidase-S11 motif RNAss are found in Enterobacteria.

Peptidase-S11 motif RNAs likely function as cis-regulatory elements, in view of their positions upstream of protein-coding genes. Indeed, virtually all Peptidase-S11 RNAs are located upstream of genes that encode peptidase S11, and are close to the start codon of that gene. Two main types of enzymatic activity are found in family S11. These are DD-carboxypeptidase activity in which there is transfer of the C-terminal D-Ala to water, and DD-transpeptidase activity in which the peptidoglycan monomer is transferred to an exogenous receptor after removal of the C-terminal D-Ala.
