= Fibro-purF RNA motif =

Fibro-purF
- Consensus secondary structure and sequence conservation of Fibro-purF RNA

Identifiers
- Symbol: Fibro-purF
- Rfam: RF02974

Other data
- RNA type: Cis-reg
- SO: SO:0005836
- PDB structures: PDBe

The Fibro-purF RNA motif is a conserved RNA structure that was discovered by bioinformatics. Fibro-purF motif RNAs are found in Fibrobacterota, a group of bacteria that are common in cow rumen. Additionally, the RNAs are found in metagenomic sequences of DNA isolated from cow rumen.

Fibro-purF motif RNAs likely function as cis-regulatory elements, in view of their positions upstream of protein-coding genes. In fact, instances of the Fibro-purF RNA motif are often located nearby to the predicted Shine-Dalgarno sequence of the downstream gene. This arrangement is consistent with a model of cis-regulation where the RNA allosterically controls access to the Shine-Dalgarno sequence, thus regulating the gene translationally.

All known Fibro-purF RNAs are found upstream of purF genes, which encode amidophosphoribosyltransferase, which participates in the biosynthesis of biological purine molecules. The Fibro-purF motif is found only in closely related organisms. As a result, the RNAs do not exhibit a high degree of mutations when compared, and it was difficult to study the RNA's secondary structure by covariation methods. As a result, the predicted secondary structure is uncertain in some places.

The Fibro-purF RNA motif was considered a potential candidate riboswitch, but no ligand has been established, as of 2022. However, experiments have confirmed that the RNA motif corresponds to a regulatory element and in vitro experiments corroborate the predicted structure. Due to the instability of the proposed ligand, 5-phospho-D-ribosylamine, direct experiments to confirm this ligand have not yet been conducted.
