= SerC leader =

serC leader
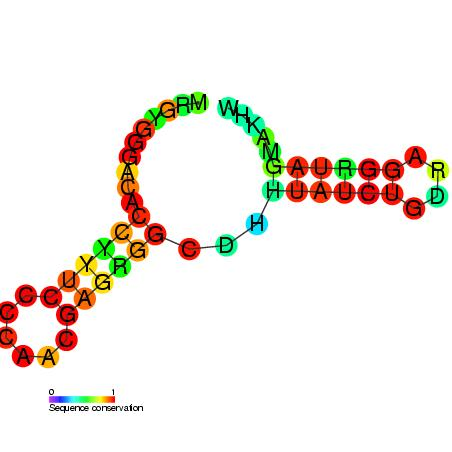
- Predicted secondary structure and sequence conservation of serC

Identifiers
- Symbol: serC
- Rfam: RF00517

Other data
- RNA type: Cis-reg; leader
- Domain(s): Bacteria
- SO: SO:0005836
- PDB structures: PDBe

SerC leader is a putative regulatory RNA structure found upstream of the serC-serA operon in some alpha-proteobacteria. The final stem of the structure overlaps the ribosome binding site of the serC reading frame.
