= MsiK RNA motif =

msiK RNA motif
- Consensus secondary structure of msiK RNAs

Identifiers
- Symbol: msiK RNA
- Rfam: RF01747

Other data
- RNA type: Cis-regulatory element
- Domain(s): Actinomycetota
- PDB structures: PDBe

The msiK RNA motif describes a conserved RNA structure discovered using bioinformatics. The RNA is always found in the presumed 5' untranslated regions of genes annotated as msiK, and is therefore hypothesized to be an RNA-based cis-regulatory element that regulates these genes.

MsiK, the protein encoded by msiK genes, is the ATPase subunit within certain ABC-type membrane transporter proteins. MsiK is thought to allow the import of multiple kinds of complex sugars. Based on analysis of various experimental reports, it was suggested that msiK RNAs are probably not involved in sensing glucose themselves, but are more likely a part of a feedback inhibition process to regulate levels of the MsiK protein.

The msi RNA motif is a hairpin with a conserved 11-nucleotide bulge (see secondary structure), as shown in the diagram. A Shine-Dalgarno sequence (predicted ribosome-binding site) overlaps a part of the msiK RNA. If msiK RNAs are cis-regulatory elements, they likely function by sequestering the ribosome-binding site, thus preventing gene translation.
