= AtpB RNA motif =

atpB
- Consensus secondary structure and sequence conservation of atpB RNA

Identifiers
- Symbol: atpB
- Rfam: RF02916

Other data
- RNA type: Cis-reg
- SO: SO:0005836
- PDB structures: PDBe

The atpB RNA motif is a conserved RNA structure that was discovered by bioinformatics. atpB motifs are found in Corynebacteriaceae.

These RNAs are consistently located upstream of atpB genes, which encode a protein that is part of ATP synthase. Therefore, it is possible that atpB RNAs regulate these genes as cis-regulatory elements.
