= IlvH RNA motif =

ilvH
- Consensus secondary structure and sequence conservation of ilvH RNA

Identifiers
- Symbol: ilvH
- Rfam: RF02993

Other data
- RNA type: Cis-reg
- SO: SO:0005836
- PDB structures: PDBe

The ilvH RNA motif is a conserved RNA structure that was discovered by bioinformatics. ilvH motifs are found in Betaproteobacteria.

ilvH motif RNAs likely function as cis-regulatory elements, in view of their positions upstream of protein-coding genes. Specifically, the RNAs are upstream of genes that encode a predicted acetolactate synthase, which is involved in the synthesis of branched-chain amino acids.
