= GltS RNA motif =

gltS
- Consensus secondary structure and sequence conservation of gltS RNA

Identifiers
- Symbol: gltS
- Rfam: RF02982

Other data
- RNA type: Cis-reg
- SO: SO:0005836
- PDB structures: PDBe

The gltS RNA motif is a conserved RNA structure that was discovered by bioinformatics. gltS motifs are found in the bacterial lineage Vibrionaceae.

gltS motif RNAs likely function as cis-regulatory elements, in view of their positions upstream of protein-coding genes. These presumably regulated genes encode subunits of glutamate synthase or a related enzyme (the exact specificity of the enzyme is uncertain). A glutamine riboswitch was discovered that is often located upstream of glutamate synthase genes, but is also present upstream of other genes, such as those encoding glutamine synthetase and ammonium transporters.
