= Enterobacteria rnk leader =

Putative attenuator element

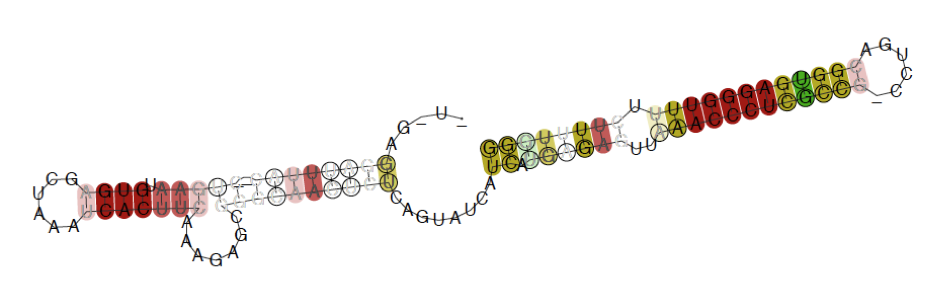
- Conserved secondary structure of Enterobacteria rnk leader, showing the fraction of canonical base pairs

Identifiers
- Symbol: rnk_leader
- Rfam: RF01771

Other data
- RNA type: Cis-reg; leader
- Domain: Enterobacteriales
- PDB structures: PDBe

The Enterobacteria rnk leader is a putative attenuator element identified by bioinformatics within bacteria of the γ-proteobacterial Enterobacteriales order. It is located upstream of the rnk gene, encoding a nucleoside diphosphate kinase regulator, and presents a Rho-independent terminator at the 3' end. This RNA is presumed to operate as a non-coding leader, which regulatory mechanism remains to be elucidated. The motif might be related to other rnk-and greA-leaders, such as Pseudomonas rnk leader.

== See also ==
- Gammaproteobacteria rimP leader
