= GP20 RNA motif =

GP20-b
- Consensus secondary structure and sequence conservation of GP20-b RNA

Identifiers
- Symbol: GP20-b
- Rfam: RF03003

Other data
- RNA type: Cis-reg
- SO: SO:0005836
- PDB structures: PDBe

The GP20 RNA motif is a conserved RNA structure that was discovered by bioinformatics. THE GP20 motif is subdivided into two related motifs, called GP20-a and GP20-b. GP20-a RNAs are found exclusively in metagenomic sequences isolated from the gut, while GP20-b RNAs are found in bacteria classified as Clostridia. Both motifs share similar, but not identical secondary structures.

GP20 motif RNAs likely function as cis-regulatory elements, in view of their positions upstream of protein-coding genes. Specifically, they are consistently upstream of GP20 genes, whose function is unknown. GP20 are usually found in phages, suggesting that GP20 RNAs are also part of phages. Indeed, one GP20-b RNA was observed in a sequenced phage: Streptococcus phage EJ-1.
