= D-alanine—D-serine ligase =

Class of enzymes

D-Alanine—D-serine ligase

Identifiers
- EC no.: 6.3.2.35

Databases
- IntEnz: IntEnz view
- BRENDA: BRENDA entry
- ExPASy: NiceZyme view
- KEGG: KEGG entry
- MetaCyc: metabolic pathway
- PRIAM: profile
- PDB structures: RCSB PDB PDBe PDBsum
Search
- PMC: articles
- PubMed: articles
- NCBI: proteins

D-Alanine—D-serine ligase (EC 6.3.2.35, VanC, VanE, VanG) is an enzyme with systematic name D-alanine:D-serine ligase (ADP-forming). This enzyme catalyses the following chemical reaction

D-alanine + D-serine + ATP $\rightleftharpoons$ D-alanyl-D-serine + ADP + phosphate

The product of this enzyme, D-alanyl-D-serine, can be incorporated into the peptidoglycan pentapeptide instead of the usual D-alanyl-D-alanine dipeptide.
