= Togavirus 5′ plus strand cis-regulatory element =

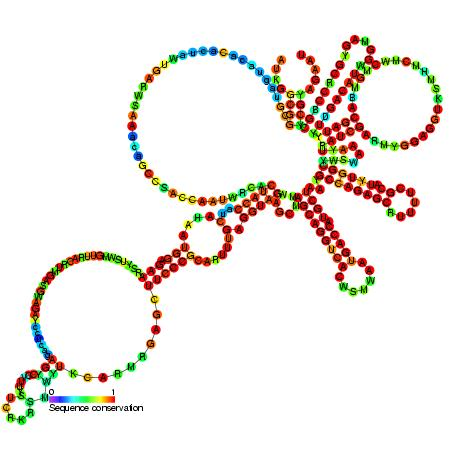
- Predicted secondary structure and sequence conservation of Toga_5_CRE

Identifiers
- Symbol: Toga_5_CRE
- Rfam: RF00470

Other data
- RNA type: Cis-reg
- Domain(s): Viruses
- SO: SO:0000233
- PDB structures: PDBe

The Togavirus 5′ plus strand cis-regulatory element is an RNA element which is thought to be essential for both plus and minus strand RNA synthesis.

Genus Alphavirus belongs to the family Togaviridae. Alpha viruses contain secondary structural motifs in the 5′ UTR that allow them to avoid detection by IFIT1.

== See also ==
- Rubella virus 3′ cis-acting element
