= Pseudomon-groES RNA motif =

Pseudomon-groES
- Consensus secondary structure of Pseudomon-groES RNAs

Identifiers
- Symbol: Pseudomonas-groES
- Rfam: RF01721

Other data
- RNA type: Cis-regulatory element
- PDB structures: PDBe

The Pseudomon-groES RNA motif is a conserved RNA structure identified in certain bacteria using bioinformatics. It is found in most species within the family Pseudomonadaceae, and is consistently located in the 5' untranslated regions (5' UTRs) of operons that contain groES genes. RNA transcripts of the groES genes in Pseudomonas aeruginosa where shown experimentally to be initiated at one of two start sites, from promoters called "P1" and "P2" (see diagram). The Pseudomon-groES RNA is in the 5' UTR of transcripts initiated from the P1 site, but is truncated in P2 transcripts. groES genes are involved in the cellular response to heat shock, but it is not thought that the Pseudomonas-groES RNA motif is involved in heat shock regulation. However, it is thought that the motif might regulate groES genes in response to other stimuli.
