= Spi-1 (PU.1) 5′ UTR regulatory element =

RNA element in Spi-1 mRNA

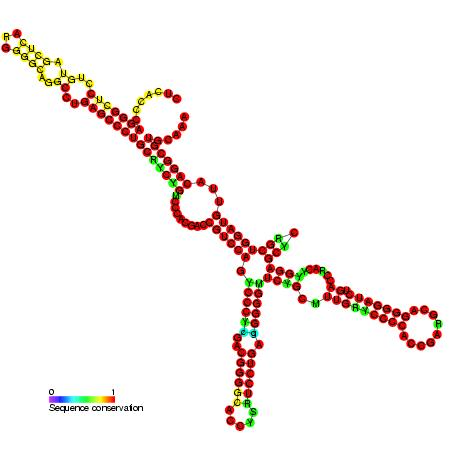
- Predicted secondary structure and sequence conservation of Spi-1

Identifiers
- Symbol: Spi-1
- Rfam: RF00232

Other data
- RNA type: Cis-reg
- Domain(s): Eukaryota
- SO: SO:0000204
- PDB structures: PDBe

The Spi-1 (PU.1) 5′ UTR regulatory element is an RNA element found in the 5′ UTR of Spi-1 mRNA which is able to inhibit the translation Spi-1 transcripts by 8-fold. Spi-1 regulates myeloid gene expression during haemopoietic development. Mutations in this regulatory region of the 5′ UTR can lead to overexpression of Spi-1 which has been linked to development of leukaemia.

== See also ==
- InvR
