= Termite-leu RNA motif =

RNA structure discovered by bioinformatics

Termite-leu RNA
- Consensus secondary structure of Termite-leu RNAs

Identifiers
- Symbol: Termite-leu RNA
- Rfam: RF01730

Other data
- RNA type: Cis-regulatory element
- Domain: Termite gut metagenome
- PDB structures: PDBe

The Termite-leu RNA motif is a conserved RNA structure discovered by bioinformatics. It is found only in DNA sequences extracted from uncultivated bacteria living in termite hindguts, and has not yet been detected in any known cultivated organism. In many cases, Termite-leu RNAs are found in the likely 5′ untranslated regions of multive genes related to the synthesis of the amino acid leucine. However, in several cases it is not found in this type of location. Therefore, it was considered ambiguous as to whether Termite-leu RNAs constitute cis-regulatory elements.
