= Mnt IRES =

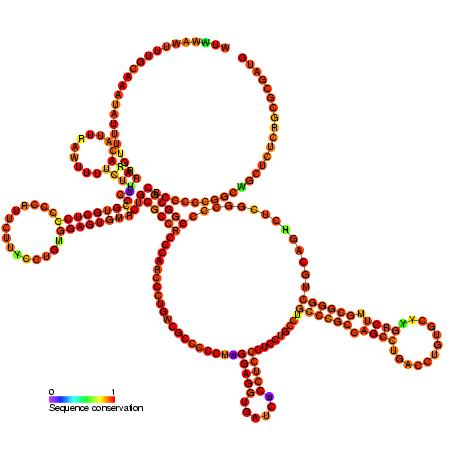
- Predicted secondary structure and sequence conservation of IRES_mnt

Identifiers
- Symbol: IRES_mnt
- Rfam: RF00457

Other data
- RNA type: Cis-reg; IRES
- Domain(s): Eukaryota
- GO: GO:0043022
- SO: SO:0000243
- PDB structures: PDBe

The Mnt internal ribosome entry site (IRES) is an RNA element. Mnt is a transcriptional repressor related to the Myc/Mad family of transcription factors. It is thought that this IRES allows efficient Mnt synthesis when cap-dependent translation initiation is reduced.

== See also ==
- N-myc IRES
- Tobamovirus IRES
- TrkB IRES
