= The Twelve Bars of Christmas =

Christmas tradition in Chicago

The Twelve Pubs of Christmas, popularly known as TBOX, which stands for Twelve Bars Of Xmas, is an annual pub crawl held in Chicago, Illinois, United States, since 1996. The event now draws tens of thousands of participants annually.

The first known '12 pubs of Christmas' started in Dublin in 1990 with Gary Lavin and Paul Sheehan of Sheehans Chatham st. The rules were simple: 25 minutes per pub; 1 beer in the allotted time; and if one did not finish, they had to drink a penalty, which was whiskey and chartreuse. The event was made famous by an article in the evening press newspaper, when it was joined by some well known names at the time, including Ken Doherty and rugby players Victor Costello, Denis Hickie, Mal o kelly and Reggie Corrigan.

The first TBOX was created in 1996, run by Christopher Festa and the company Festa Parties, with continued support through 2011 by Jess Loren.

It is held in the Wrigleyville area, and has changed theme each year. More than 40 bars participate, and some have been known to have more than 40 kegs in anticipation. In 2008, TBOX attracted 6,700 participants.

The event gained national recognition in 2010 after becoming the unofficial largest pub crawl with over 10,000 attendees. The name of the event is a playful spin on The Twelve Days of Christmas. The event is distinguished by its 8 am start time and encouragement of participants to dress in elaborate holiday-themed costumes. The proceeds of the $1 entry fee for the 2010 event in Memphis, Tennessee, were donated to the Humane Society of Memphis & Shelby Country.

The event is still run by Christopher Festa and the company Festa Parties. It has grown over the years, and gained fame through big name partners and sponsorships. Sponsors have included Miller Lite, Effen Vodka, Jägermeister, Sailor Jerry, Jim Beam and American Harvest Vodka. A portion of the proceeds from the event go to helping local and national charities, and has provided local area businesses with economic support, being either the highest grossing day of the year, or second only to St. Patrick's Day.

In 2012, the TBOX is billed as one of the largest and most spectacular events in Chicago, with more than 22,000 paid participants. The TBOX 2012 theme was TBOXOPOLY, to celebrate the 17th year of this annual gathering. The charity partner was The Hope Foundation.

It was announced on August 31, 2013, that the TBOX2013 event would be produced as a benefit for Lakeview Pantry, a food bank and hunger assistance center in the Lakeview neighborhood of Chicago, which Festa Parties has donated cereal to throughout 2013. The company has also produced an annual Mardi Gras pub crawl event each February since 2009 known as BeadQuest
