= CtRNA =

ctRNA
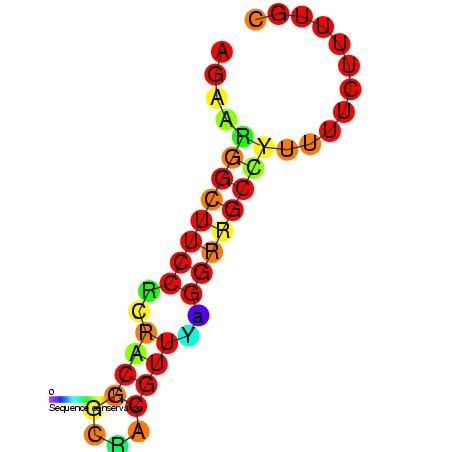
- Predicted secondary structure and sequence conservation of ctRNA_p42d

Identifiers
- Symbol: ctRNA_p42d
- Rfam: RF00489

Other data
- RNA type: Gene; antisense
- Domain(s): Bacteria
- SO: SO:0000644
- PDB structures: PDBe

In molecular biology ctRNA (counter-transcribed RNA) is a plasmid encoded noncoding RNA that binds to the mRNA of repB and causes translational inhibition. ctRNA is encoded by plasmids and functions in rolling circle replication to maintain a low copy number. In Corynebacterium glutamicum, it achieves this by antisense pairing with the mRNA of RepB, a replication initiation protein. In Enterococcus faecium the plasmid pJB01 contains three open reading frames, copA, repB, and repC. The pJB01 ctRNA is coded on the opposite strand from the copA/repB intergenic region and partially overlaps an atypical ribosome binding site for repB.

== See also ==
- S-element
