= EngA RNA motif =

engA
- Consensus secondary structure and sequence conservation of engA RNA

Identifiers
- Symbol: engA
- Rfam: RF02972

Other data
- RNA type: Cis-reg
- SO: SO:0005836
- PDB structures: PDBe

The engA RNA motif is a conserved RNA structure that was discovered by bioinformatics. engA motifs are found in bacteria within the genus Prevotella.

engA motif RNAs likely function as cis-regulatory elements, in view of their positions upstream of protein-coding genes. They are consistently located upstream of genes encoding GTPases, many of which are annotated as encoding the protein EngA. EngA participates in ribosome stability and assembly.
