= HopC RNA motif =

hopC RNA
- Consensus secondary structure of hopC RNAs

Identifiers
- Symbol: hopC RNA
- Rfam: RF01741

Other data
- RNA type: Cis-regulatory element
- Domain(s): Helicobacter
- PDB structures: PDBe

The hopC RNA motif is a predicted cis-regulatory element identified by a bioinformatic screen for conserved RNA secondary structures. hopC RNAs are exclusively found within bacteria classified within the genus Helicobacter, some of which are human pathogens that infect the stomach and can cause ulcers.

hopC RNAs are found upstream of an operon of two genes called hopC and hopB (also called alpa and alpB). Experiments on the start of transcription for the hopCB operon indicate that hopC RNAs lie within the 5' untranslated region of this operon. The hopCB operon is induced to higher levels of expression in response to low pH. This fits in with data that HopCB is involved in binding to human epithelial cells, which is presumably something that the bacteria do during infection of the low-pH environment of the stomach.

Previous work suggested that a repeat of 13 thymidine nucleotides might be involved in regulating the abundance of the hopCB operon. However, this 13-nucleotide region lies upstream of the transcription start site, and is therefore independent of hopC motif RNAs.
