= PyrR binding site =

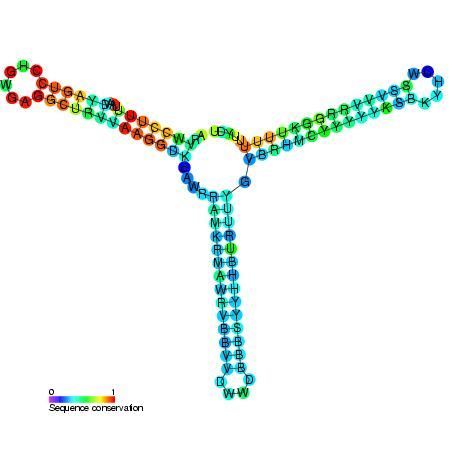
- Predicted secondary structure and sequence conservation of PyrR

Identifiers
- Symbol: PyrR
- Rfam: RF00515

Other data
- RNA type: Cis-reg
- Domain(s): Bacteria
- SO: SO:0000233
- PDB structures: PDBe

The PyrR binding site is an RNA element that is found upstream of a variety of genes involved in pyrimidine biosynthesis and transport.

The RNA structure permits binding of PyrR protein which regulates pyrimidine biosynthesis in Bacillus subtilis. When the protein binds, a downstream terminator hairpin forms, repressing transcription of biosynthesis genes.
