= ChrB RNA motif =

chrB-b
- Consensus secondary structure and sequence conservation of chrB-b RNA

Identifiers
- Symbol: chrB-b
- Rfam: RF03086

Other data
- RNA type: Cis-reg
- SO: SO:0005836
- PDB structures: PDBe

The chrB-a RNA motif and chrB-b RNA motif refer to a related, conserved RNA structure that was discovered by bioinformatics. The structures of these motifs are similar, and some genomic locations are predicted to exhibit both motifs. The chrB-b motif has an extra pseudoknot that is not consistently found in chrB-a examples. It was proposed that the two motifs could be unified into one common structure, with additional information.

Both motifs are found in Alphaproteobacteria and likely function as cis-regulatory elements, in view of their positions upstream of protein-coding genes. Additionally, the Shine-Dalgarno sequence of the genes is a part of the conserved secondary structure of the chrB motifs. Thus, a stabilization of this secondary structure is expected to reduce gene expression.

The genes apparently regulated by these RNAs share a relationship with each other in that they are involved in resistance to toxic levels of chromate:

- Many of these genes are classified as the gene chrB, which was found to improve the resistance of Ochrobactrum tritici to chromate.
- Genes classified as chrA are also common.
- Genes that encode the enzyme superoxide dismutase are also common, and this gene also has an established role in chromate resistance.
- Rarely regulated genes with and without a relationship to chromate were also discussed.

Additionally, a chrB gene regulated by a chrB-a RNA in Sinorhizobium meliloti strain 1021 is highly expressed in bacteria growing on plants.
