= Burkholderiales-2 RNA motif =

Burkholderiales-2
- Consensus secondary structure and sequence conservation of Burkholderiales-2 RNA

Identifiers
- Symbol: Burkholderiales-2
- Rfam: RF02917

Other data
- RNA type: Cis-reg
- SO: SO:0005836
- PDB structures: PDBe

The Burkholderiales-2 RNA motif is a conserved RNA structure that was discovered by bioinformatics. Burkholderiales-2 motifs are found in Betaproteobacteria. Although one example is predicted in the phylum Bacteroidota, this is likely to be the result of a recent horizontal gene transfer or sequence contamination.

Burkholderiales-2 RNAs likely function in trans as sRNAs. There is weak evidence of an association with S24 peptidases.
