= Lnt RNA motif =

Conserved RNA structure in some bacteria

Lnt RNA

Identifiers
- Symbol: Lnt
- Rfam: RF01711

Other data
- RNA type: Cis-reg;
- Domain(s): Bacteria;
- SO: SO:0005836
- PDB structures: PDBe

Consensus secondary structure of Lnt RNAs. This figure is adapted from a previous publication.

The Lnt RNA motif refers to a conserved RNA structure found in certain bacteria. Specifically, Lnt RNAs are known only in species within the phylum Chlorobiota, and are located in the possible 5' untranslated regions (5' UTRs) of genes that are annotated as encoding apolipoprotein N-acyltransferase enzymes. There is some doubt as to whether the indicated motif is transcribed as RNA, or whether its reverse complement is transcribed. If the reverse complement is transcribed it would potentially in 5' UTRs of genes encoding bacteriochlorophyll A, and would be close to the start codon of those genes.
