= Enterovirus 5′ cloverleaf cis-acting replication element =

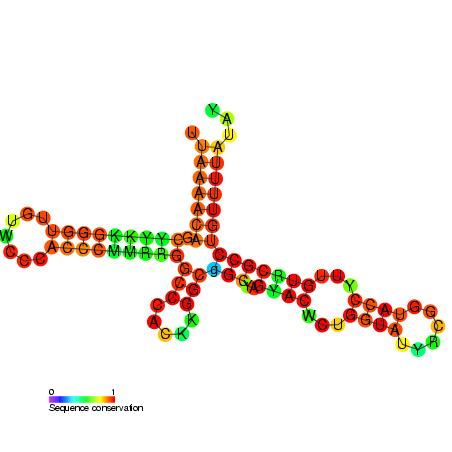
- Predicted secondary structure and sequence conservation of Entero_5_CRE

Identifiers
- Symbol: Entero_5_CRE
- Rfam: RF00386

Other data
- RNA type: Cis-reg
- Domain(s): Viruses
- SO: SO:0000233
- PDB structures: PDBe

The Enterovirus 5′ cloverleaf cis-acting replication element is an RNA element found in the 5′ UTR of Enterovirus genomes. The element has a cloverleaf like secondary structure and is known to be a multifunctional cis-acting replication element (CRE), required for the initiation of negative strand RNA synthesis.

== See also ==
- Enteroviral 3′ UTR element
- Enterovirus cis-acting replication element
