= Fusobacteriales-1 RNA motif =

Conserved RNA structure

Fusobacteriales-1
- Consensus secondary structure and sequence conservation of Fusobacteriales-1 RNA

Identifiers
- Symbol: Fusobacteriales-1
- Rfam: RF02920

Other data
- RNA type: Cis-reg
- SO: SO:0005836
- PDB structures: PDBe

The Fusobacteriales-1 RNA motif is a conserved RNA structure that was discovered by bioinformatics. Fusobacteriales-1 motif RNAs are found in Fusobacteriales.

Most Fusobacteriales-1 RNAs are located upstream of genes homologous to the locus FSAG_00736, which encodes a hypothetical protein in Fusobacterium peridonticum. However, some Fusobacteriales-1 RNAs are located upstream of genes that do not appear to be homologous to FSAG_00736. Additionally 1 Fusobacteriales-1 RNAs is not found upstream of a protein-coding gene. In view of this information, it is ambiguous whether Fusobacteriales-1 RNAs function as cis-regulatory elements or whether they operate in trans.
