= PhrS =

PhrS is a bacterial small RNA found in Pseudomonas aeruginosa. It was first identified in a RNAomics screen and has since been found to act as a link between oxygen availability and quorum sensing.

Synthesis of PhrS is dependent on the oxygen-responsive global regulator ANR, which is required for PhrS synthesis. The Hfq protein may also bind to PhrS. In turn, PhrS regulates the transcriptional regulator PqsR which positively controls those genes involved in quorum sensing regulation in P. aeruginosa.
