= DUF1874 RNA motif =

DUF1874
- Consensus secondary structure and sequence conservation of DUF1874 RNA

Identifiers
- Symbol: DUF1874
- Rfam: RF02953

Other data
- RNA type: Cis-reg
- SO: SO:0005836
- PDB structures: PDBe

The DUF1874 RNA motif is a conserved nucleic acid structure that was discovered by bioinformatics. The DUF1874 motif has not (as of 2018) been detected in any classified organism, but rather is known only in metagenomic DNA sequences isolated from hot springs.

DUF1874 are frequently present in consecutive intergenic regions between consecutive genes. All of these genes are encoded on the same DNA strand. For this reason, it was proposed that DUF1874 motif examples likely function as "attC" sites as part of an integron, as attC sites occur in integrons between a run of consecutive genes that have been taken up by the integron. attC sites are singled-stranded DNA elements that are used by integrons to enabling the rearrangement and integration of new genes into the intron. Thus, if the preceding hypothesis is true, then the DUF1874 motif function as single-stranded DNA. Although the arrangement of DUF1874 motif examples and genes is typical of integrons, no integrase gene was detected in the metagenomic contigs that contain DUF1874 motif examples. This absence could occur because the sequences are truncated in metagenomic contigs, because some integrons lack integrases or because the attC site hypothesis is incorrect.
