= NarK RNA motif =

narK
- Consensus secondary structure and sequence conservation of narK RNA

Identifiers
- Symbol: narK
- Rfam: RF03032

Other data
- RNA type: Cis-reg
- SO: SO:0005836
- PDB structures: PDBe

The narK RNA motif is a conserved RNA structure that was discovered by bioinformatics. narK motif RNAs are found in Beta- and Gammaproteobacteria.

narK RNAs likely function as cis-regulatory elements, in view of their positions upstream of protein-coding genes. Four genes are presumably regulated by narK RNA, and they encode: a nitrate transporter, proteins with sulfite- and nitrate reductase domains, proteins in the major facilitator superfamily and cyclic di-GMP-specific phosphodiesterases of the EAL family. It was therefore proposed that there is good evidence that narK RNAs regulate genes in cis, and that they might play a role related to nitrate.
