= SucA RNA motif =

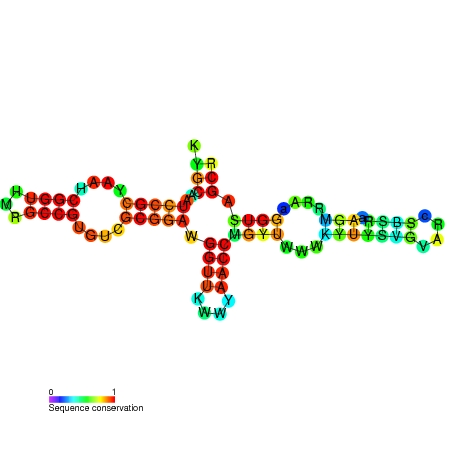
- Predicted secondary structure and sequence conservation of sucA

Identifiers
- Symbol: sucA
- Rfam: RF01070

Other data
- RNA type: Cis-reg
- Domain(s): Bacteria
- SO: SO:0005836
- PDB structures: PDBe

The sucA RNA motif is a conserved RNA structure found in bacteria of the order Burkholderiales. RNAs within this motif are always found in the presumed 5' UTR of sucA genes. sucA encodes a subunit of an enzyme that participates in the citric acid cycle by synthesizing succinyl-CoA from 2-oxoglutarate. A part of the conserved structure overlaps predicted Shine-Dalgarno sequences (involved in ribosome binding) of the downstream sucA genes. Because of the RNA motif's consistent gene association and a possible mechanism for sequestering the ribosome binding site, it was proposed that the sucA RNA motif corresponds to a cis-regulatory element. Its relatively complex secondary structure could indicate that it is a riboswitch. However, the function of this RNA motif remains unknown.

== See also ==
- SucA-II RNA motif
- SucC RNA motif
