= FTHFS RNA motif =

FTHFS
- Consensus secondary structure and sequence conservation of FTHFS RNA

Identifiers
- Symbol: FTHFS
- Rfam: RF02981

Other data
- RNA type: Cis-reg
- SO: SO:0005836
- PDB structures: PDBe

The FTHFS RNA motif is a conserved RNA structure that was discovered by bioinformatics. FTHFS motifs are found in metagenomic sequences derived from samples of the human gut.

FTHFS motif RNAs likely function as cis-regulatory elements, in view of their positions upstream of protein-coding genes. FTHFS RNAs are consistently located upstream of genes encoding formate-tetrahydrofolate ligase, which produces 10-formyltetrahydrofolate. Such genes are also very commonly regulated by the previously established ZMP/ZTP riboswitch. These ZMP/ZTP-sensing riboswitches detect a shortage of formyltetrahydrofolate by measuring the levels of ZMP and or its triphosphorylated form ZTP; because formyltetrahydrofolate is heavily used in the de novo purine synthesis pathway, formyltetrahydrofolate starvation leads to a buildup of the purine intermediate ZMP, or the result of its triphosphorylation, ZTP. It was, however, noted that the secondary structure of the FTHFS motif is simpler than many riboswitches, and it is less clear if this motif represents a promising riboswitch candidate.
