= COG2908 RNA motif =

COG2908
- Consensus secondary structure and sequence conservation of COG2908 RNA

Identifiers
- Symbol: COG2908
- Rfam: RF02939

Other data
- RNA type: Cis-reg
- SO: SO:0005836
- PDB structures: PDBe

The COG2908 RNA motif is a conserved RNA structure that was discovered by bioinformatics. COG2908 motif RNAs are found in genomic sequences extracted from fresh water environments. They have not, as of 2018, been detected in any classified organism.

COG2908 motif RNAs likely function as cis-regulatory elements, in view of their positions upstream of protein-coding genes. Indeed, the RNAs are upstream of multiple genes that encode non-homologous proteins. If all examples of the RNA were upstream of homologous genes, there is the possibility that the RNAs were conserved in that position simply by inheritance. The non-homology of the genes downstream of COG2908 RNAs makes this scenario less likely. However, the functions of the genes apparently regulated by COG2908 RNAs are largely unknown, and therefore no hypothesis of the biological function of this RNA motif has been advanced.
