= Luteovirus cap-independent translation element =

Luteovirus cap-independent translation element (BTE)
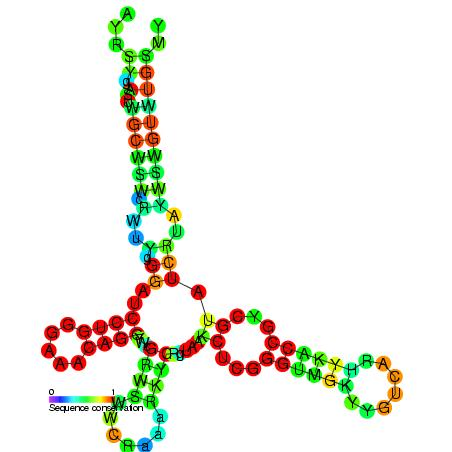
- Predicted secondary structure and sequence conservation of BTE

Identifiers
- Symbol: BTE
- Rfam: RF00434

Other data
- RNA type: Cis-reg
- Domain(s): Viruses
- SO: SO:0000233
- PDB structures: PDBe

The Barley yellow dwarf virus-like cap-independent translation element (BTE) is an RNA element found in the 3' UTR of some luteoviruses. This element mediates translation of genomic RNA and subgenomic RNA1 (sgRNA1).

BTEs have a consensus sequence, GGAUCCUGGGAAACAGG, embedded in series of three to six stem-loops that radiate from a central hub.

BTE has been found to bind to eIF4G and weakly to eIF4E (proteins involved in translation initiation). BTE allows translation initiation of an mRNA without a 7mG cap (required for translation in most eukaryotic mRNA). Other forms of cap-independent translation elements (CITE) exist (primarily in plant viruses from the Luteovirus, Necrovirus, Dianthovirus and Umbravirus genera of plantviruses, but also in some host mRNA; notably many heat shock mRNA lack a 7mG cap but are still translated). The general purpose of BTE and these other CITE's is to get the ribosome to begin translation without the 7mG cap. In the case of BTE it "tricks" eIF4F (eIF4E, eIF4G are parts of eIF4F) into "telling" the ribosome that a 7mG cap is present.
