= YybP-ykoY leader =

RNA element

yybP-ykoY leader
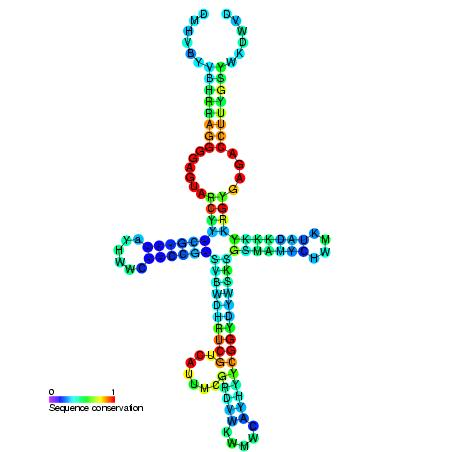
- Predicted secondary structure and sequence conservation of yybP-ykoY

Identifiers
- Symbol: yybP-ykoY
- Alt. Symbols: SraF
- Rfam: RF00080

Other data
- RNA type: Cis-reg; riboswitch
- Domain: Bacteria
- SO: SO:0000233
- PDB structures: PDBe

The yybP-ykoY leader RNA element was originally discovered in E. coli during a large scale screen and was named SraF. This family was later found to exist upstream of related families of protein genes in many bacteria, including the yybP and ykoY genes in B. subtilis. The specific functions of these proteins are unknown, but this structured RNA element may be involved in their genetic regulation as a riboswitch. The yybP-ykoY element was later proposed to be manganese-responsive after another associated family of genes, YebN/MntP, was shown to encode Mn^{2+} efflux pumps in several bacteria. Genetic data and a crystal structure confirmed that yybp-ykoY is a manganese riboswitch that directly binds Mn^{2+}.
