= Rubella virus 3′ cis-acting element =

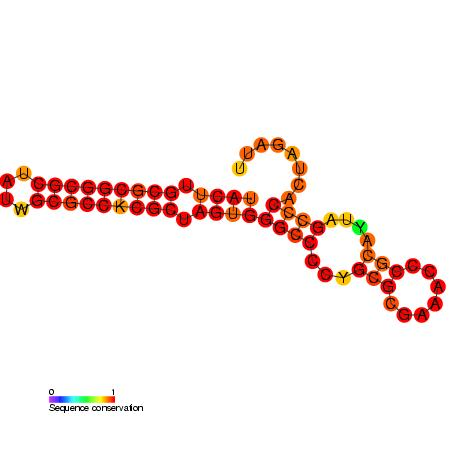
- Predicted secondary structure and sequence conservation of Rubella_3

Identifiers
- Symbol: Rubella_3
- Alt. Symbols: Rubella_cis_act
- Rfam: RF00194

Other data
- RNA type: Cis-reg
- Domain(s): Viruses
- SO: SO:0000233
- PDB structures: PDBe

The Rubella virus 3′ cis-acting element RNA family represents a cis-acting element found at the 3′ UTR in the rubella virus. This family contains three conserved step loop structures. Calreticulin (CAL), which is known to bind calcium in most eukaryotic cells, is able to specifically bind to the first stem loop of this RNA. CAL binding is thought to be related to viral pathogenesis and in particular arthritis which occurs frequently in rubella infections in adults and is independent of viral viability. All stem loop structures are thought to be important for efficient viral replication and deletion of stem loop three is known to be lethal.

== See also ==
- Togavirus 5′ plus strand cis-regulatory element
