= Hepatitis C alternative reading frame stem-loop =

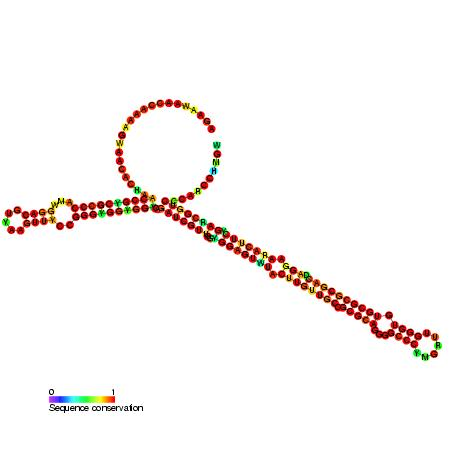
- Predicted secondary structure and sequence conservation of HCV_ARF_SL

Identifiers
- Symbol: HCV_ARF_SL
- Rfam: RF00620

Other data
- RNA type: Cis-reg
- Domain: Viruses
- SO: SO:0000233
- PDB structures: PDBe

Hepatitis C alternative reading frame stem-loop is a conserved secondary structure motif identified in the RNA genome of the hepatitis C virus (HCV) which is proposed to have an important role in regulating translation and repression of the viral genome.

The core protein-coding region of the hepatitis C virus (HCV) genome contains a +1 alternative reading frame (ARF) and two proposed phylogenetically conserved RNA helix-forming stem loop structures (IV and VII). The proteins translated from the ARF appear to be translated during the normal viral life cycle but are not essential to virus replication. The two predicted stem loops shown here (SLV and SLVI) are proposed to be important for HCV translation and repression; these stem loops are located downstream of the internal ribosome entry site (IRES) but their functional role is unknown.

== See also ==
- Hepatitis E virus cis-reactive element
