= Gammaproteobacteria rimP leader =

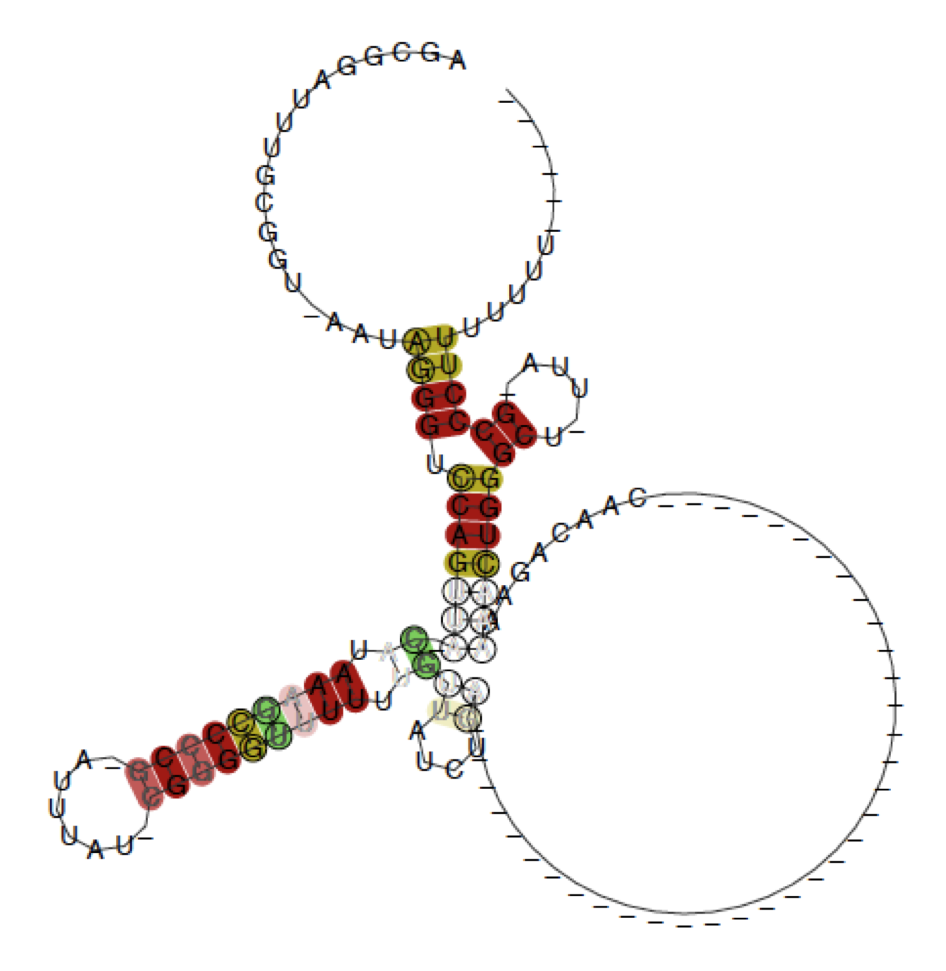
- Conserved secondary structure of rimP leader, showing the fraction of canonical base pairs

Identifiers
- Symbol: rimP
- Rfam: RF01770

Other data
- RNA type: Cis-reg; leader
- Domain(s): Gammaproteobacteria
- PDB structures: PDBe

The γ-proteobacterial rimP leader is a putative attenuator element identified by bioinformatics within bacteria of the γ-proteobacterial phylum. It is located upstream of the rimP-nusA-infB operon encoding RimP, a protein shown to be involved in the 30S ribosomal subunit maturation, NusA, a transcriptional factor controlling termination, and the translation initiation factor IF-2 respectively. The rimP-leader presents a Rho-independent terminator at the 3' end, corresponding to a highly conserved GGGc(...)gCCC motif. This motif is presumed to operate as a non-coding leader. Its mechanism remains unknown, but it is tempting to speculate a regulatory involvement of the NusA protein, which expression has been shown to lower the operon expression, and which is already involved in the attenuation of the Trp, His and S10 operons.
