= T-box leader =

RNA element

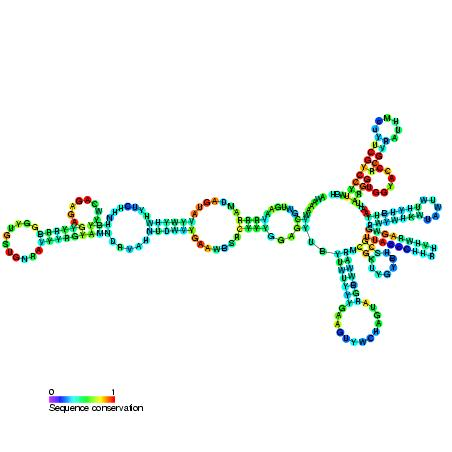
- Predicted secondary structure and sequence conservation of T-box

Identifiers
- Symbol: T-box
- Rfam: RF00230

Other data
- RNA type: Cis-reg; leader;
- Domain(s): Bacteria
- GO: GO:0000049
- SO: SO:0000140
- PDB structures: PDBe

Usually found in gram-positive bacteria, the T box leader sequence is an RNA element that controls gene expression through the regulation of translation by binding directly to a specific tRNA and sensing its aminoacylation state. This interaction controls expression of downstream aminoacyl-tRNA synthetase genes, amino acid biosynthesis, and uptake-related genes in a negative feedback loop. The uncharged tRNA acts as the effector for transcription antitermination of genes in the T-box leader family. The anticodon of a specific tRNA base pairs to a specifier sequence within the T-box motif, and the NCCA acceptor tail of the tRNA base pairs to a conserved bulge in the T-box antiterminator hairpin.

== tRNA-mediated attenuation ==
Although the exact mechanism of T box leader is still unclear and currently being studied, it has recently been recognized as a member of an expanding group of RNAs that are phylogenetically conserved across many gram-positive bacteria. They are structurally complex and able to directly sense physiological signals which results in the control of downstream gene expression. This controlling of gene expression is accomplished by transcriptional attenuation—a general transcriptional regulation strategy that senses when an alteration in the rate of transcription is necessary and initiating alteration at a particular site (sometimes preceding one or more genes of an operon). The operons that encode aminoacyl-tRNA synthetases, regulated by tRNA-mediated transcriptional attenuation, contain a leader region that specifies a transcript segment that can fold and eventually form a complex set of structures. Two of the most crucial segments to attenuation function as both the terminator and the antiterminator in different regulatory situations.

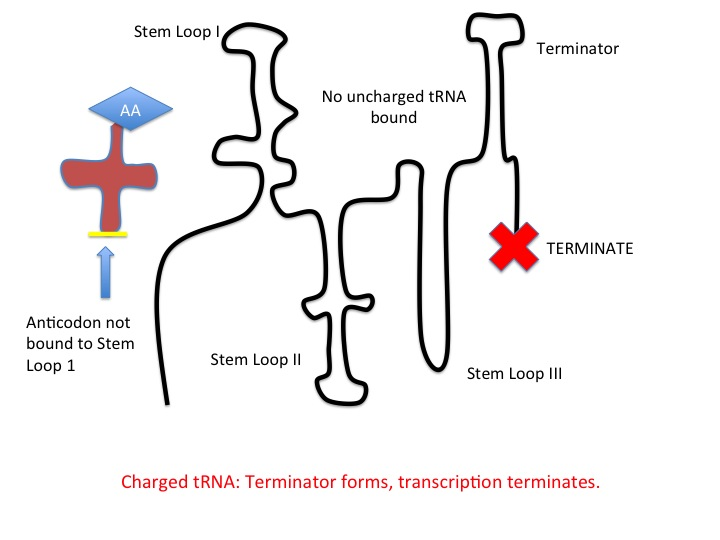
When the charged tRNA is abundant, the tRNA does not bind, the T-Box Leader takes on its terminator form, and transcription is terminated

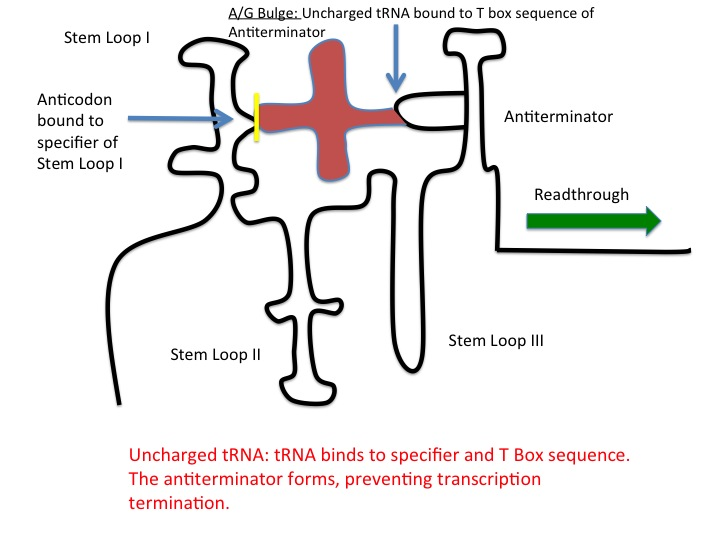
When the uncharged tRNA is abundant, the tRNA binds, the T-Box Leader takes on its antiterminator form, and transcription is not terminated

== Leader structure ==
In terms of structure, the T box RNA is highly conserved—especially in the stem I distal region. The stem I region forms an arched conformation, with the apex containing a complex loop-loop interaction between the conserved adenine-guanine bulge and distal loop. This loop-loop structure is similar to that seen in the ribosome exit site, suggesting that it is highly conserved among tRNA recognition sites. The apex of the stem I region recognizes two critical positions on the tRNA: the anticodon and D/T-loops. Extensive intermolecular interactions occur at this site. If the length or orientation of these two recognition points is altered or mismatched, the T box riboswitch and tRNA complex is disrupted, and proper functioning of transcriptional regulation cannot occur.

== Riboswitch function ==
The riboswitch functions by directly sensing a physiological signal. Next, a specific uncharged tRNA binds to a riboswitch element in the transcript, and a structural change occurs in the transcript that promotes expression of the downstream coding sequence. The specifier sequence is the first recognition sequence in the leader. It is complementary to the anticodon of the tRNA that is a substrate of the tRNA synthetase under regulation. The second tRNA binding sequence, the T box sequence, is complementary to the nucleotide preceding the acceptor end of the tRNA. The T box is found in the side bulge of the antiterminator.

== Method of regulation ==
The most common model system used to study T-box leader is in the gram-positive bacterium Bacillus subtilis. In terms of what is currently understood about the regulatory role of T box function, it appears that when the uncharged tRNA is abundant, it binds to the specifier and the T box sequence of an appropriate leader RNA, stabilizing the antiterminator and, in turn, preventing terminator formation. Without terminator formation, transcription will proceed. If, however, the tRNA is charged, its acceptor end will be blocked by an amino acid and thus, cannot pair with the T box. The terminator will then form, thereby terminating transcription.
