= Hepatitis E virus cis-reactive element =

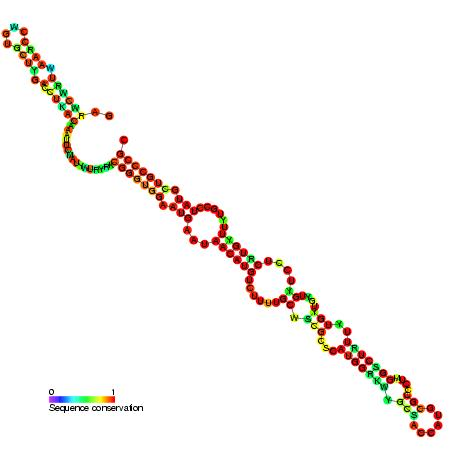
- Predicted secondary structure and sequence conservation of HepE_CRE

Identifiers
- Symbol: HepE_CRE
- Rfam: RF00550

Other data
- RNA type: Cis-reg
- Domain(s): Viruses
- SO: SO:0000233
- PDB structures: PDBe

The hepatitis E virus cis-reactive element is an RNA element that is believed to be essential for "some step in gene expression". The mutation of this element resulted in hepatitis E strains which were unable to infect rhesus macaques (Macaca mulatta).
