= Terminator (genetics) =

Section of nucleic acid sequence

In genetics, a transcription terminator is a section of nucleic acid sequence that marks the end of a gene or operon in genomic DNA during transcription. This sequence mediates transcriptional termination by providing signals in the newly synthesized transcript RNA that trigger processes which release the transcript RNA from the transcriptional complex. These processes include the direct interaction of the mRNA secondary structure with the complex and/or the indirect activities of recruited termination factors. Release of the transcriptional complex frees RNA polymerase and related transcriptional machinery to begin transcription of new mRNAs.

== In prokaryotes ==
Simplified schematics of the mechanisms of prokaryotic transcriptional termination. In Rho-independent termination, a terminating hairpin forms on the nascent mRNA interacting with the NusA protein to stimulate release of the transcript from the RNA polymerase complex (top). In Rho-dependent termination, the Rho protein binds at the upstream rut site, translocates down the mRNA, and interacts with the RNA polymerase complex to stimulate release of the transcript.

Two classes of transcription terminators, Rho-dependent and Rho-independent, have been identified throughout prokaryotic genomes. These widely distributed sequences are responsible for triggering the end of transcription upon normal completion of gene or operon transcription, mediating early termination of transcripts as a means of regulation such as that observed in transcriptional attenuation, and to ensure the termination of runaway transcriptional complexes that manage to escape earlier terminators by chance, which prevents unnecessary energy expenditure for the cell.

=== Rho-dependent terminators ===
Rho-dependent transcription terminators require a large protein called a Rho factor which exhibits RNA helicase activity to disrupt the mRNA-DNA-RNA polymerase transcriptional complex. Rho-dependent terminators are found in bacteria and phages. The Rho-dependent terminator occurs downstream of translational stop codons and consists of an unstructured, cytosine-rich sequence on the mRNA known as a Rho utilization site (rut), and a downstream transcription stop point (tsp). The rut serves as a mRNA loading site and as an activator for Rho; activation enables Rho to efficiently hydrolyze ATP and translocate down the mRNA while it maintains contact with the rut site. Rho is able to catch up with the RNA polymerase because it is being stalled at the downstream tsp sites. Multiple different sequences can function as a tsp site. Contact between Rho and the RNA polymerase complex stimulates dissociation of the transcriptional complex through a mechanism involving allosteric effects of Rho on RNA polymerase.

=== Rho-independent terminators ===
Intrinsic transcription terminators or Rho-independent terminators require the formation of a self-annealing hairpin structure on the elongating transcript, which results in the disruption of the mRNA-DNA-RNA polymerase ternary complex. The terminator sequence in DNA contains a 20 basepair GC-rich region of dyad symmetry followed by a short poly-A tract or "A stretch" which is transcribed to form the terminating hairpin and a 7–9 nucleotide "U tract" respectively. The mechanism of termination is hypothesized to occur through a combination of direct promotion of dissociation through allosteric effects of hairpin binding interactions with the RNA polymerase and "competitive kinetics". The hairpin formation causes RNA polymerase stalling and destabilization, leading to a greater likelihood that dissociation of the complex will occur at that location due to increased time spent paused at that site and reduced stability of the complex. Additionally, the elongation protein factor NusA interacts with the RNA polymerase and the hairpin structure to stimulate transcriptional termination.

== In Archaea ==
Transcription termination in archaea is not explained by a single pathway. Current work supports a mixed picture in which some archaeal transcripts end mainly at short U rich sequence signals, whereas others require dedicated protein factors that cut the RNA or actively dismantle the transcription complex. Archaeal termination differs from the usual bacterial model, where a strong RNA hairpin often plays the main role. At the same time, it also resembles eukaryotic RNA 3′ end processing because it involves the conserved nuclease aCPSF1, also known in some studies as FttA.

=== Sequence driven termination ===
One major archaeal termination route is guided by the sequence of the transcript itself. In many archaea, the main stop signal is a short run of uridines in the RNA. These U rich tracts can cause the archaeal RNA polymerase to stop and release the transcript without the prominent upstream stem-loop that characterizes many bacterial intrinsic terminators. Sequences around the U rich tract can still influence how strongly termination occurs but the uridine rich region is the core signal.

=== aCPSF1/FttA-dependent termination ===
A second major pathway uses the conserved factor aCPSF1 (Archaeal Cleavage and Polyadenylation Specificity Factor), often referred to as FttA (Factor that terminates transcription in Archaea). These enzymes are found across all archaeal phyla and are homologous to the eukaryotic nuclease CPSF-73. Instead of depending solely on passive release at a U-rich tract, aCPSF1/FttA recognizes U rich terminator regions, cleaves the RNA near its 3′ end and actively promotes transcription termination.

=== Eta-dependent termination ===
Some Euryarchaea also use a different factor dependent mechanism that relies on Eta (Euryarchaeal Termination Activity), an ATP-dependent helicase. Eta does not terminate transcription by cleaving the RNA. Instead, it acts directly on the transcription elongation complex and uses energy from ATP hydrolysis to disrupt that complex and release the nascent RNA. It also appears to be especially important for removing stalled or arrested transcription complexes that would otherwise remain on the template.

== In eukaryotes ==
In eukaryotic transcription of mRNAs, terminator signals are recognized by protein factors that are associated with the RNA polymerase II and which trigger the termination process. The genome encodes one or more polyadenylation signals. Once the signals are transcribed into the mRNA, the proteins cleavage and polyadenylation specificity factor (CPSF) and cleavage stimulation factor (CstF) transfer from the carboxyl terminal domain of RNA polymerase II to the poly-A signal. These two factors then recruit other proteins to the site to cleave the transcript, freeing the mRNA from the transcription complex, and add a string of about 200 A-repeats to the 3' end of the mRNA in a process known as polyadenylation. During these processing steps, the RNA polymerase continues to transcribe for several hundred to a few thousand bases and eventually dissociates from the DNA and downstream transcript through an unclear mechanism; there are two basic models for this event known as the torpedo and allosteric models.

=== Torpedo model ===
After the mRNA is completed and cleaved off at the poly-A signal sequence, the left-over (residual) RNA strand remains bound to the DNA template and the RNA polymerase II unit, continuing to be transcribed. After this cleavage, a so-called exonuclease binds to the residual RNA strand and removes the freshly transcribed nucleotides one at a time (also called 'degrading' the RNA), moving towards the bound RNA polymerase II. This exonuclease is XRN2 (5'-3' Exoribonuclease 2) in humans. This model proposes that XRN2 proceeds to degrade the uncapped residual RNA from 5' to 3' until it reaches the RNA pol II unit. This causes the exonuclease to 'push off' the RNA pol II unit as it moves past it, terminating the transcription while also cleaning up the residual RNA strand.

Similar to Rho-dependent termination, XRN2 triggers the dissociation of RNA polymerase II by either pushing the polymerase off of the DNA template or pulling the template out of the RNA polymerase. The mechanism by which this happens remains unclear, however, and has been challenged not to be the sole cause of the dissociation.

In order to protect the transcribed mRNA from degradation by the exonuclease, a 5' cap is added to the strand. This is a modified guanine added to the front of mRNA, which prevents the exonuclease from binding and degrading the RNA strand. A 3' poly(A) tail is added to the end of a mRNA strand for protection from other exonucleases as well.

=== Allosteric model ===
The allosteric model suggests that termination occurs due to the structural change of the RNA polymerase unit after binding to or losing some of its associated proteins, making it detach from the DNA strand after the signal. This would occur after the RNA pol II unit has transcribed the poly-A signal sequence, which acts as a terminator signal.

RNA polymerase is normally capable of transcribing DNA into single-stranded mRNA efficiently. However, upon transcribing over the poly-A signals on the DNA template, a conformational shift is induced in the RNA polymerase from the proposed loss of associated proteins from its carboxyl terminal domain. This change of conformation reduces RNA polymerase's processivity making the enzyme more prone to dissociating from its DNA-RNA substrate. In this case, termination is not completed by degradation of mRNA but instead is mediated by limiting the elongation efficiency of RNA polymerase and thus increasing the likelihood that the polymerase will dissociate and end its current cycle of transcription.

=== Non-mRNAs ===
The several RNA polymerases in eukaryotes each have their own means of termination. Pol I is stopped by TTF1 (yeast Nsi1), which recognizes a downstream DNA sequence; the endonuclease is XRN2 (yeast Rat1). Pol III is able to terminate transcription on a stretch of As on the template strand.

Finally, Pol II also have poly(A)-independent modes of termination, which is required when it transcribes snRNA and snoRNA genes. In yeast, the protein Nrd1 is responsible, along with Nab3 (multiple human homologs including HNRNPC and RALY) and Sen1, collectively making up the "NNS" pathway.

Some human mechanism, possibly PCF11, seems to cause premature termination when pol II transcribes HIV genes.

== See also ==
- Stop codon
- Termination factor
- Transcription (biology)
