= Termination factor =

Protein signal which causes the release of transcribed RNA at a stop codon

In molecular biology, a termination factor is a protein that mediates the termination of RNA transcription by recognizing a transcription terminator and causing the release of the newly made mRNA. This is part of the process that regulates the transcription of RNA to preserve gene expression integrity and are present in both eukaryotes and prokaryotes, although the process in bacteria is more widely understood. The most extensively studied and detailed transcriptional termination factor is the Rho (ρ) protein of E. coli.

== Prokaryotic ==
Prokaryotes use one type of RNA polymerase, transcribing mRNAs that code for more than one type of protein. Transcription, translation and mRNA degradation all happen simultaneously. Transcription termination is essential to define boundaries in transcriptional units, a function necessary to maintain the integrity of the strands and provide quality control. Termination in E. coli may be Rho dependent, utilizing Rho factor, or Rho independent, also known as intrinsic termination. Although most operons in DNA are Rho independent, Rho dependent termination is also essential to maintain correct transcription.

ρ factor The Rho protein is an RNA translocase that recognizes a cytosine-rich region of the elongating mRNA, but the exact features of the recognized sequences and how the cleaving takes place remain unknown. Rho forms a ring-shaped hexamer and advances along the mRNA, hydrolyzing ATP toward RNA polymerase (5' to 3' with respect to the mRNA). When the Rho protein reaches the RNA polymerase complex, transcription is terminated by dissociation of the RNA polymerase from the DNA. The structure and activity of the Rho protein is similar to that of the F_{1} subunit of ATP synthase, supporting the theory that the two share an evolutionary link.

Rho factor is widely present in different bacterial sequences and is responsible for the genetic polarity in E. coli. It works as a sensor of translational status, inhibiting non-productive transcriptions, suppressing antisense transcriptions and resolving conflicts that happen between transcription and replication. The process of termination by Rho factor is regulated by attenuation and antitermination mechanisms, competing with elongation factors for overlapping utilization sites (ruts and nuts), and depends on how fast Rho can move during the transcription to catch up with the RNA polymerase and activate the termination process.

Inhibition of Rho dependent termination by bicyclomycin is used to treat bacterial infections. The use of this mechanism along with other classes of antibiotics is being studied as a way to address antibiotic resistance, by suppressing the protective factors in RNA transcription while working in synergy with other inhibitors of gene expression such as tetracycline or rifampicin.

== Eukaryotic ==
The process of transcriptional termination is less understood in eukaryotes, which have extensive post-transcriptional RNA processing, and each of the three types of eukaryotic RNA polymerase have a different termination system.

In RNA polymerase I, Transcription termination factor, RNA polymerase I binds downstream of the pre-rRNA coding regions, causing the dissociation of the RNA polymerase from the template and the release of the new RNA strand.

In RNA polymerase II, the termination occurs via a polyadenylation/cleaving complex. The 3' tail on the ending of the strand is bound at the polyadenylation site, but the strand will continue to code. The newly synthesised ribonucleotides are removed one at a time by the cleavage factors CSTF and CPSF, in a process that is still not fully understood. The remainder of the strand is disengaged by a 5′-exonuclease when the transcription is finished.

RNA polymerase III terminates after a series of uracil polymerization residues in the transcribed mRNA. Unlike in bacteria and in polymerase I, the termination RNA hairpin needs to be upstream to allow for correct cleaving.

== See also ==
- Rho factor
