= Magnesium responsive RNA element =

The Magnesium responsive RNA element, not to be confused with the completely distinct M-box riboswitch, is a cis-regulatory element that regulates the expression of the magnesium transporter protein MgtA. It is located in the 5' UTR of this gene. The mechanism for the potential magnesium-sensing capacity of this RNA is still unclear, though a recent report suggests that the RNA element targets the mgtA transcript for degradation by RNase E when cells are grown in high Mg^{2+} environments.

== Background ==
The term riboswitches refer to a collective group of cis-regulatory elements which are mostly located in the untranslated regions of messenger RNAs. The purpose of these molecules is that they have the ability to regulate gene expression through the association with different metabolites, and as such, do not require assistance from various protein factors. These specific types of RNA can have individualized structures and functions, but for the most part, have certain features and functions which remain conserved.

=== Structure ===
Magnesium responsive RNA element
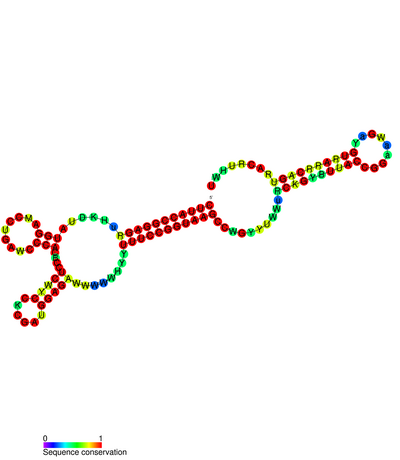

Identifiers
- Symbol: Mg sensor
- Rfam: RF01056

Other data
- RNA type: Cis-regulatory element
- Domain: Enterobacteriales
- GO: 0032026
- PDB structures: PDBe

The fundamental structure of a riboswitch consists of two structural elements which remain highly conserved in most of these types of RNAs. These two elements are the aptamer and the expression platform. The main role of the aptamer is to sense the presence of a specific ligand whereas the expression platform is more important in controlling gene expression in a variety of ways. More specifically, in a bacterial riboswitch, it is noted that the expression platform is usually located downstream of the aptamer. As a result, this allows for the expression platform to be able to assess the degree of binding occurring between the ligand and the RNA so that it may function in a way that confers proper gene regulation and expression. However, this property of expression platforms to manipulate their own tertiary structure to ensure proper gene expression is what allows for the alteration of these conserved regions which is not seen in the aptamerportion of the riboswitch. The aptamer region tends to maintain both its sequences and structures due to the fact that there are only four monomers which RNAs utilize in order to form the binding pocket which will serve as a binding site for a specific metabolite. This differs from the expression platform because the structure, and possibly sequence, contained within this region of the riboswitch has the ability to engage in alternative folding structures that may contribute to the efficiency in which genes are expressed. Thus, this warrants the observation that the expression platform tends to be less conserved evolutionary than the aptamer region.

=== Function ===
The evolutionary divergence of the expression platform from this conserved pathway has numerous implications in the various functions displayed by different riboswitches. Such functions can include transcription termination, translation initiation, eukaryotic splicing mechanisms, transcription interference, self-cleaving, and many more. Of these functions, the most common function that simple riboswitches participate in is regulation of transcription termination. In order to modulate this process, a bacterial riboswitch will aid in the development of a strong stem-like structure which is followed by a series of uridine residues. The purpose of this structure and sequence is to facilitate the appearance of an intrinsic transcription terminator. During transcription, this intrinsic terminator will be encountered by RNA polymerase and cause this transcriptional protein to briefly stall before releasing the DNA template and novel RNA product. Nonetheless, though there are various types of riboswitches with various structures and functions, the remainder of this article is going to discuss the magnesium responsive RNA element and its respective structure and function.

== Magnesium responsive RNA element ==
A specific type of bacterial riboswitch which plays a major role in maintaining magnesium homeostasis is known as the magnesium responsive RNA element. This riboswith is located in the 5' untranslated region of the gene mgtA which consists of 264 nucleotides.

=== Structure ===
Much like other general riboswitches, the modulation of gene expression through ligand binding still stands. However, what makes this cis-regulatory element unique is the fact that it shares a distinct relationship with RNA through its positively-charged magnesium ion that serves as the ligand. The structural function of this divalent ion involves the stabilization of complex RNA folds seen in the tertiary structure of an RNA molecule. Without the presence of the magnesium ion, the folding of RNA molecules which is utilized to form a proper ligand binding pocket would not be possible since the charge-charge repulsion due to the negatively-charged phosphate-rich RNA backbone would prevent this site from forming.

=== Function ===
Moreover, recent studies have depicted the magnesium responsive RNA element as having two very distinct functions. The first function that has been characterized for this molecule is its ability to serve as a magnesium sensor. What this means is that in times when the concentration of magnesium is low in cells, this riboswitch will alter its conformation in such a way that it favors transcription elongation. On the other hand, when the concentration of magnesium is high in cells, the riboswitch will again undergo a conformational change. However, this time the change in conformation will result in the transcriptional inactivation of downstream genes. These changes in conformation result in the formation of a pseudoknot due to the mechanism in which the RNA element interacts with the magnesium ions. The implication for this form of magnesium concentration-dependent regulation is for the purpose of maintaining a steady-state level of magnesium within the cells which is consistent with the theory of mass action. The actual mechanism by which the magnesium responsive RNA element has the ability to perform transcriptional regulation is still not clearly understood. However, a recent report suggests that there is the possibility for the magnesium responsive RNA element to have the capacity to target the mgtA transcript for degradation by the RNase E. This would only apply under conditions where the cells are grown under high magnesium ion conditions. The other function that has been recently suggested for this specific type of riboswitch is its involvement in the process of mRNA degradation. It has been noted that there again appears to be a magnesium concentration-dependent response. In this case though, this response causes the 5'-UTR region of mgtA to be targeted for degradation.

Although the magnesium responsive RNA element appears similar to the M-box riboswitch based on structure and function, they are not the same. The way in which both the M-box riboswitch may appear similar to that of the magnesium responsive RNA element is in the structures of their respective aptamers. The M-box riboswitch has been found to contain a metalloregulatory RNA similar in structure and function to that of the magnesium responsive RNA element. Similarly, this riboswitch also has the ability to become involved in transcriptional and translational regulation. For instance, the version of the M-box riboswitch which is found in the microorganism B. subtilis has the ability to shut off the expression of downstream genes in a magnesium-concentration dependent manner. However, what sets the magnesium responsive RNA element apart from this type of riboswitch is the fact that they display different distribution patterns in relation to the genes that they transcriptionally regulate. As opposed to the mgtA riboswitch class which regulates genes downstream of itself, the M-box riboswitch class is instead located upstream of the genes that it regulates which includes genes that encode magnesium transporters and other various proteins such as a Mycobacterium cell surface protein and cell division proteins.
