= Pseudomonas sRNA P1 =

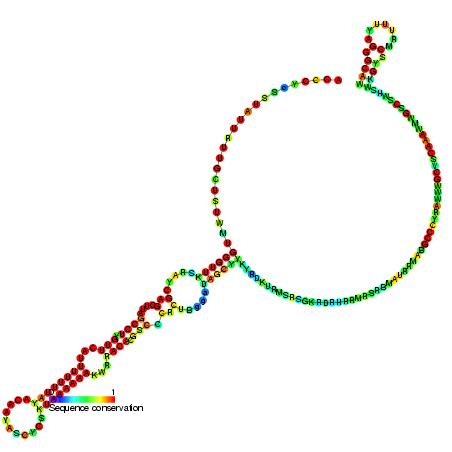
- Predicted secondary structure and sequence conservation of P1

Identifiers
- Symbol: P1
- Rfam: RF00623

Other data
- RNA type: Gene
- Domain(s): Bacteria
- SO: SO:0000655
- PDB structures: PDBe

Pseudomonas sRNA P1 is a ncRNA that was predicted using bioinformatic tools in the genome of the opportunistic pathogen Pseudomonas aeruginosa and its expression verified by northern blot analysis.

There appears to be two related copies of P1 sRNA in the P. aeruginosa PA01 genome and both copies appear to be located upstream of predicted glutamine synthetase genes. This sRNA appears to be conserved amongst several Pseudomonas species. P1 has a predicted Rho independent terminator at the 3′ end but the function of P1 is unknown.

== See also ==
- Pseudomonas sRNA P9
- Pseudomonas sRNA P11
- Pseudomonas sRNA P15
- Pseudomonas sRNA P16
- Pseudomonas sRNA P24
- Pseudomonas sRNA P26
