= Transcription-translation coupling =

Mechanism of gene expression regulation

Transcription-translation coupling is a mechanism of gene expression regulation in which synthesis of an mRNA (transcription) is affected by its concurrent decoding (translation). In prokaryotes, mRNAs are translated while they are transcribed. This allows communication between RNA polymerase, the multisubunit enzyme that catalyzes transcription, and the ribosome, which catalyzes translation. Coupling involves both direct physical interactions between RNA polymerase and the ribosome ("expressome" complexes), as well as ribosome-induced changes to the structure and accessibility of the intervening mRNA that affect transcription ("attenuation" and "polarity").

== Significance ==
Bacteria depend on transcription-translation coupling for genome integrity, termination of transcription and control of mRNA stability. Consequently, artificial disruption of transcription-translation coupling impairs the fitness of bacteria. Without coupling, genome integrity is compromised as stalled transcription complexes interfere with DNA replication and induce DNA breaks. Lack of coupling produces premature transcription termination, likely due to increased binding of termination factor Rho. Degradation of prokaryotic mRNAs is accelerated by loss of coupled translation due to increased availability of target sites of RNase E. It has also been suggested that coupling of transcription with translation is an important mechanism of preventing formation of deleterious R-loops. While transcription-translation coupling is likely prevalent across prokaryotic organisms, not all species are dependent on it. Unlike Escherichia coli, in Bacillus subtilis transcription significantly outpaces translation, and coupling consequently does not occur.

== Mechanisms ==
Translation promotes transcription elongation and regulates transcription termination. Functional coupling between transcription and translation is caused by direct physical interactions between the ribosome and RNA polymerase ("expressome complex"), ribosome-dependent changes to nascent mRNA secondary structure which affect RNA polymerase activity (e.g. "attenuation"), and ribosome-dependent changes to nascent mRNA availability to transcription termination factor Rho ("polarity").

=== Expressome complex ===
The expressome is a supramolecular complex consisting of RNA polymerase and a trailing ribosome linked by a shared mRNA transcript. It is supported by the transcription factors NusG and NusA, which interact with both RNA polymerase and the ribosome to couple the complexes together. When coupled by transcription factor NusG, the ribosome binds newly synthesized mRNA and prevents formation of secondary structures that inhibit transcription. Formation of an expressome complex also aids transcription elongation by the trailing ribosome opposing back-tracking of RNA polymerase. Three-dimensional models of ribosome-RNA polymerase expressome complexes have been determined by cryo-electron microscopy.

=== Ribosome-mediated attenuation ===
Ribosome-mediated attenuation is a gene expression mechanism in which a transcriptional termination signal is regulated by translation. Attenuation occurs at the start of some prokaryotic operons at sequences called "attenuators", which have been identified in operons encoding amino acid biosynthesis enzymes, pyrimidine biosynthesis enzymes and antibiotic resistance factors. The attenuator functions via a set of mRNA sequence elements that coordinate the status of translation to a transcription termination signal:

- A short open reading frame encoding a "leader peptide"
- A transcription pause sequence
- A "control region"
- A transcription termination signal

Once the start of the leader open reading frame has been transcribed, RNA polymerase pauses due to folding of the nascent mRNA. This programmed arrest of transcription gives time for translation of the leader peptide to commence, and transcription to resume once coupled to translation. The downstream "control region" then modulates the elongation rate of either the ribosome or RNA polymerase. The factor determining this depends on the function of the downstream genes (e.g. the operon encoding enzymes involved in the synthesis of histidine contains a series of histidine codons is the control region). The role of the control region is to modulate whether transcription remains coupled to translation depending on the cellular state (e.g. a low availability of histidine slows translation leading to uncoupling, while high availability of histidine permits efficient translation and maintains coupling). Finally, the transcription terminator sequence is transcribed. Whether transcription is coupled to translation determines whether this stops transcription. The terminator requires folding of the mRNA, and by unwinding mRNA structures the ribosome elects the formation of either of two alternative structures: the terminator, or a competing fold termed the "antiterminator".

For amino acid biosynthesis operons, these allow the gene expression machinery to sense the abundance of the amino acid produced by the encoded enzymes, and adjust the level of downstream gene expression accordingly: transcription occurring only if the amino acid abundance is low and the demand for the enzymes is therefore high. Examples include the histidine (his) and tryptophan (trp) biosynthetic operons.

The term "attenuation" was introduced to describe the his operon. While it is typically used to describe biosynthesis operons of amino acids and other metabolites, programmed transcription termination that does not occur at the end of a gene was first identified in λ phage. The discovery of attenuation was significant as it represented a regulatory mechanism distinct from repression. The trp operon is regulated by both attenuation and repression, and was the first evidence that gene expression regulation mechanisms can be overlapping or redundant.

=== Polarity ===
"Polarity" is a gene expression mechanism in which transcription terminates prematurely due to a loss of coupling between transcription and translation. Transcription outpaces translation when the ribosome pauses or encounters a premature stop codon. This allows the transcription termination factor Rho to bind the mRNA and terminate mRNA synthesis. Consequently, genes that are downstream in the operon are not transcribed, and therefore not expressed. Polarity serves as mRNA quality control, allowing unused transcripts to be terminated prematurely, rather than synthesized and degraded.

The term "polarity" was introduced to describe the observation that the order of genes within an operon is important: a nonsense mutation within an upstream gene effects the transcription of downstream genes. Furthermore, the position of the nonsense mutation within the upstream gene modulates the "degree of polarity", with nonsense mutations at the start of the upstream genes exerting stronger polarity (more reduced transcription) on downstream genes.

Unlike the mechanism of attenuation, which involves intrinsic termination of transcription at well-defined programmed sites, polarity is Rho-dependent and termination occurs at variable position.

== Discovery ==
The potential for transcription and translation to regulate each other was recognized by the team of Marshall Nirenberg, who discovered that the processes are physically connected through the formation of a DNA-ribosome complex. As part of the efforts of Nirenberg's group to determine the genetic code that underlies protein synthesis, they pioneered the use of cell-free in vitro protein synthesis reactions. Analysis of these reactions revealed that protein synthesis is mRNA-dependent, and that the sequence of the mRNA strictly defines the sequence of the protein product. For this work in breaking in the genetic code, Nirenberg was jointly awarded the Nobel Prize in Physiology or Medicine in 1968. Having established that transcription and translation are linked biochemically (translation depends on the product of transcription), an outstanding question remained whether they were linked physically - whether the newly synthesized mRNA released from the DNA before it is translated, or if can translation occur concurrently with transcription. Electron micrographs of stained cell-free protein synthesis reactions revealed branched assemblies in which strings of ribosomes are linked to a central DNA fibre. DNA isolated from bacterial cells co-sediment with ribosomes, further supporting the conclusion that transcription and translation occur together. Direct contact between ribosomes and RNA polymerase are observable within these early micrographs. The potential for simultaneous regulation of transcription and translation at this junction was noted in Nirenberg's work as early as 1964.
