= Phenyl dihydrogen phosphate =

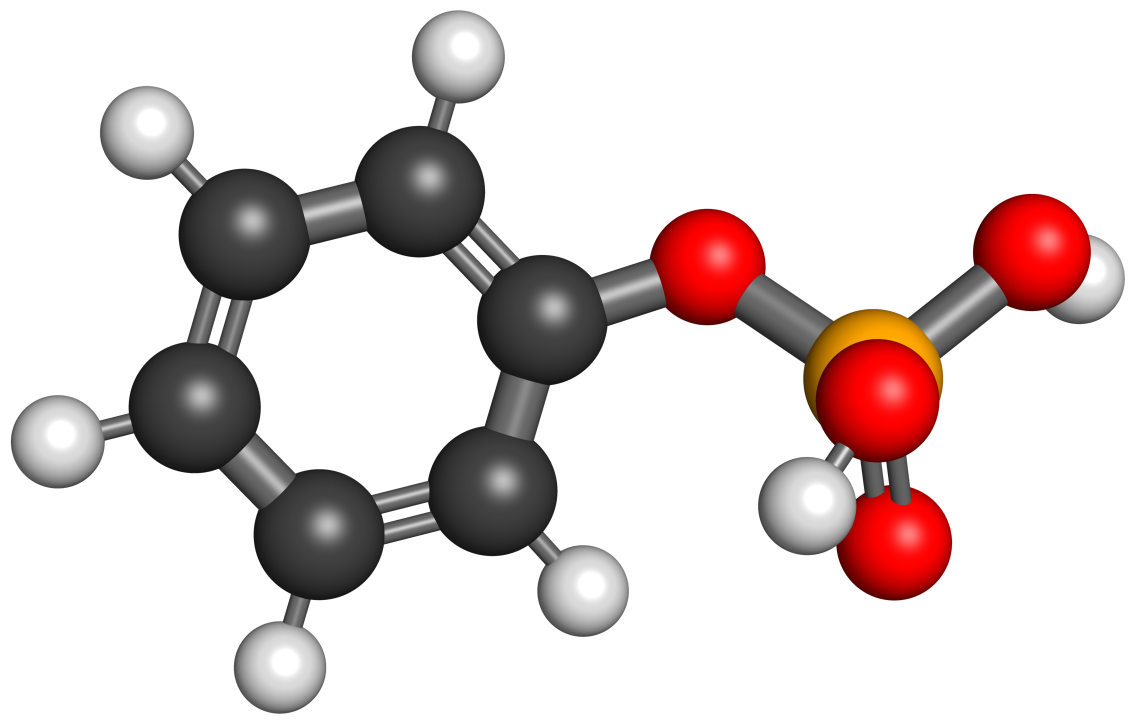

Names
- IUPAC name phenyl dihydrogen phosphate
- Other names: Phenyl phosphate; monophenylphosphate; monophenyl ester of phosphoric acid; Phenolic phosphate

Identifiers
CAS Number	701-64-4
3D model (JSmol)	Interactive image
ChEBI	CHEBI:37548
ChEMBL	ChEMBL26128
ChemSpider	12267
DrugBank	DB03298
ECHA InfoCard	100.010.781
EC Number	211-857-7
KEGG	C02734
PubChem CID	12793
UNII	75M88J863E
CompTox Dashboard (EPA)	DTXSID6044981
- InChI: InChI=1S/C6H7O4P/c7-11(8,9)10-6-4-2-1-3-5-6/h1-5H,(H2,7,8,9) Key: CMPQUABWPXYYSH-UHFFFAOYSA-N
- SMILES: C1=CC=C(C=C1)OP(=O)(O)O

Properties
Chemical formula	C_{6}H_{7}O_{4}P
Molar mass	174.092 g·mol^{−1}
Appearance	Clear, colorless liquid
Density	1.14

Hazards
- GHS labelling
Pictograms	(GHS05: Corrosive) (GHS07: Exclamation mark)
Signal word	Danger
Hazard statements	H314, H315, H319
Precautionary statements	P260, P264, P264+P265, P280, P301+P330+P331, P302+P352, P302+P361+P354, P304+P340, P305+P351+P338, P305+P354+P338, P316, P317, P321, P332+P317, P337+P317, P362+P364, P363, P405, P501
- Except where otherwise noted, data are given for materials in their standard state (at 25 °C [77 °F], 100 kPa). Infobox references

Phenyl dihydrogen phosphate, also known as phenyl phosphate, is a monophenyl ester of phosphoric acid, an organophosphorus compound that is an aryl-phosphate formed by the esterification of phosphoric acid with phenol. Its chemical formula is C_{6}H_{7}O_{4}P. In mice and rats it functions as a metabolite.

Phenyl phosphate is the very first detectable compound into which phenol is converted when it is broken down in the absence of oxygen (for example, in the bacteria Thauera aromatica or denitrifying strains of Pseudomonas).

== Physical and chemical properties ==
Phenyl dihydrogen phosphate is a clear, colorless liquid with a characteristic odor, slightly thicker than water.

== Uses ==
It is used in manufacturing and industrial purposes, mainly as a catalyst for the production of resins and paints.

== Metabolism ==
The anaerobic degradation of phenol proceeds via its phosphorylation to phenyl phosphate, which serves as the activated substrate for subsequent carboxylation to 4-hydroxybenzoate. This initial step is catalyzed by a Mn^{2+} dependent phenol-phosphorylating enzyme through a mechanism involving a phosphorylated enzyme intermediatesimilar to the bacterial sugar phosphotransferase system. In beta-proteobacteria thauera aromatica the anaerobic metabolism of phenol proceeds via its conversion to phenyl phosphate by a three-component phenyl phosphate synthase, which utilizes the energy of MgATP hydrolysis. Proteins 1 and 2 catalyze the following reaction: phenol + MgATP + H2O → phenyl phosphate + MgAMP + orthophosphate, transferring the β-phosphate group to activate the substrate for subsequent carboxylation (Kolbe-Schmitt carboxylation) to 4-hydroxybenzoate; this enzymatic complex consists of three proteins structurally related to phosphoenolpyruvate synthase, enabling efficient phenol capture even at low environmental concentrations (Km 0.04 mM).

In rats, after oral administration, 2-ethylhexyl diphenyl phosphate (EHDPP) is rapidly absorbed and metabolized to form the main metabolites diphenyl phosphate and phenol, as well as minor products (p-hydroxyphenylphenyl phosphate and phenyl dihydrogen phosphate), which are primarily excreted in the urine, phenyl dihydrogen phosphate is characterized as a minor product of this metabolism.
