= Rickettsia rpsL leader =

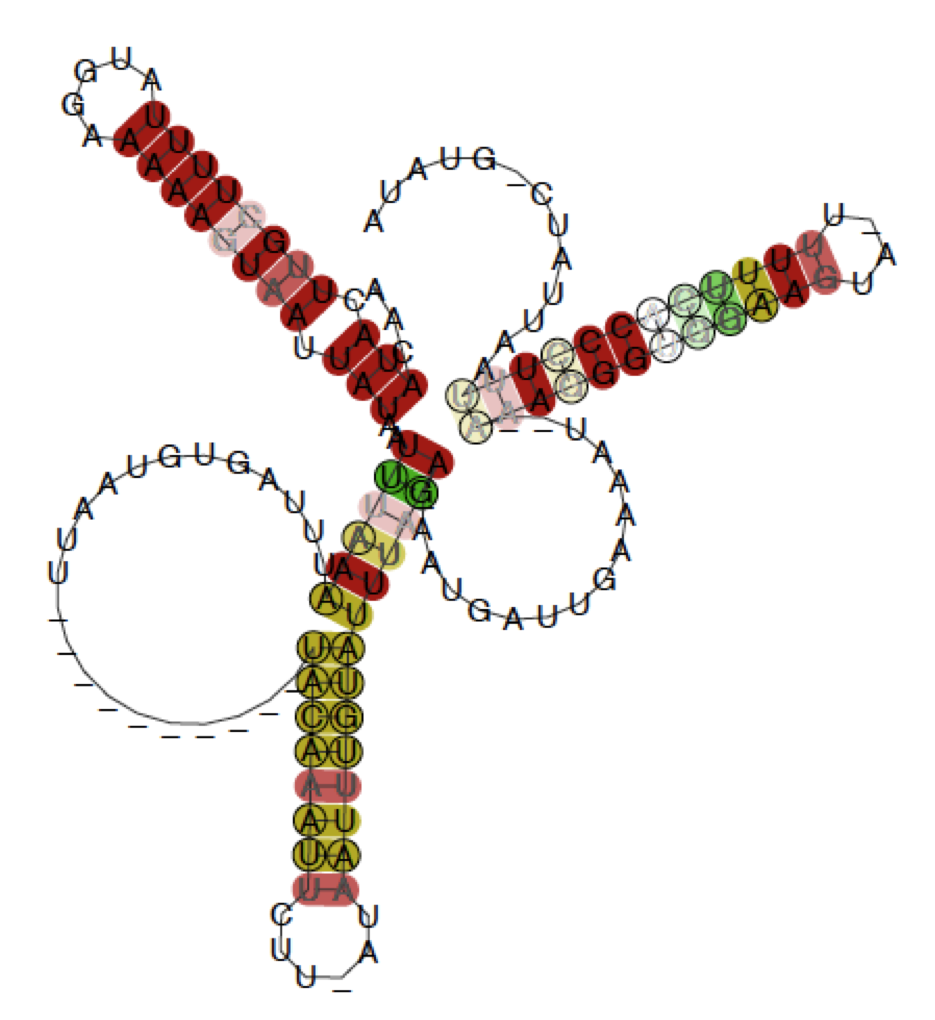
- Conserved secondary structure of Rickettsia rpsL leader showing the fraction of canonical base pairs

Identifiers
- Symbol: rpsL_ricks
- Rfam: RF01774

Other data
- RNA type: Cis-reg; leader
- Domain(s): Rickettsia
- PDB structures: PDBe

The Rickettsia rpsL leader is a putative attenuator element identified by bioinformatics within bacteria of the α-proteobacterial genus Rickettsia. It is located upstream of the operon encoding ribosomal proteins S12 and S7 (rpsL and rpsG genes respectively), and presents a Rho-independent terminator at the 3' end. This RNA is presumed to operate as a non-coding ribosomal protein leader potentially interacting with the S12 or S7 proteins, encoded by the operon. The motif might be related to other rpsL leaders, such as that from Pseudomonas.
