= Pseudomonas sRNA P15 =

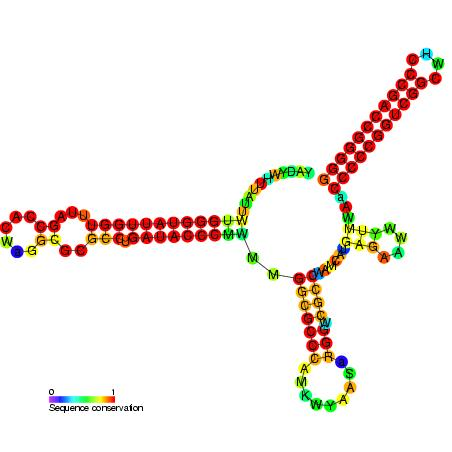
- Predicted secondary structure and sequence conservation of P15

Identifiers
- Symbol: P15
- Rfam: RF00627

Other data
- RNA type: Gene
- Domain(s): Bacteria
- SO: SO:0000655
- PDB structures: PDBe

Pseudomonas sRNA P15 is a ncRNA that was predicted using bioinformatic tools in the genome of the opportunistic pathogen Pseudomonas aeruginosa and its expression verified by northern blot analysis.

P15 is conserved across several Pseudomonas species and is consistently located upstream of a 3-deoxy-7-phosphoheptulonate synthase gene. P15 has a predicted Rho independent terminator at the 3′ end but the function of P15 is unknown.

== See also ==
- Pseudomonas sRNA P1
- Pseudomonas sRNA P9
- Pseudomonas sRNA P11
- Pseudomonas sRNA P16
- Pseudomonas sRNA P24
- Pseudomonas sRNA P26
