= YkoK leader =

ykoK leader
- Predicted secondary structure and sequence conservation of ykoK

Identifiers
- Symbol: ykoK
- Rfam: RF00380

Other data
- RNA type: Cis-reg; riboswitch
- Domain(s): Bacteria
- SO: SO:0000233
- PDB structures: PDBe

The Ykok leader or M-box is a Mg^{2+}-sensing RNA structure that controls the expression of Magnesium ion transport proteins in bacteria. It is a distinct structure to the Magnesium responsive RNA element.

The Ykok leader was originally described as a conserved sequence with potential riboswitch function found upstream of the B. subtilis ykoK gene and genes with related functions in other bacteria. Examples of the conserved M-box RNA structure occur upstream of each of the three major families of Mg^{2+} transporters (CorA, MgtE and MgtA/MgtB) in various bacterial species.

The molecular structure of the M-box example upstream of the B. subtilis ykoK gene includes six bound Mg^{2+} ions. Biochemical studies indicate that this M-Box RNA compacts in the presence of Mg^{2+} and other divalent ions. This folding process appears to disrupt an antiterminator structure, and thereby allow a transcription terminator structure to form. As expected from this model, B. subtilis cells repress expression of a downstream reporter gene when grown in the presence of Mg^{2+}. Therefore, the M-box appears to function as a genetic "off" switch that is important for maintaining Mg^{2+} homeostasis in bacteria.

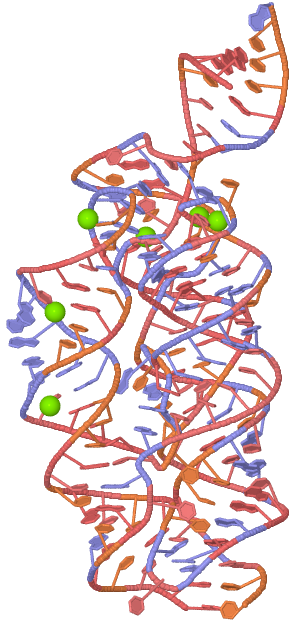
A 3D representation of the Ykok leader. Structure of the M-box riboswitch aptamer domain from Bacillus subtilis.
