= Magnesium transporter E =

MgtE
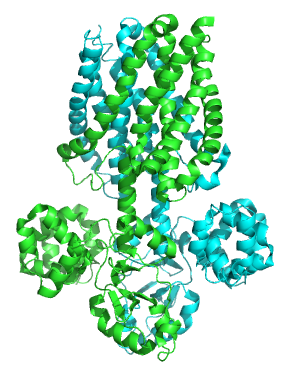
- Crystal structure of magnesium transporter MgtE. PDB 2zy9

Identifiers
- Symbol: MgtE
- Pfam: PF01769
- InterPro: IPR006667
- TCDB: 1.A.26
- OPM superfamily: 180
- OPM protein: 2yvx
Available protein structures:
- PDB: IPR006667 PF01769 (ECOD; PDBsum)
- AlphaFold: IPR006667; PF01769

Magnesium transporters E (MgtE) are a family of transmembrane eubacterial MgtE magnesium transporters. Related regions are found also in archaeal and eukaryotic proteins. They have sizes that vary considerably from 311 residues for the Methanococcus thermoautotrophicum protein, 463 residues for a Synechocystis homologue, and 513 residues for the human homologue, SLC41A1. These proteins are capable of transporting Mg^{2+} and Co^{2+} but not Ni^{2+}. Multiple alignments contain two highly conserved aspartates that may be involved in cation binding.

Human transporters from this family are SLC41A1, SLC41A2 and SLC41A3.

== Structure and Mechanism ==
The Bacillus firmus transporter and several homologues examined have strongly charged, hydrophilic N-terminal domains (cytoplasmic) followed by a hydrophobic C-terminal domain with 5 putative transmembrane α-helical spanners. A central 100 residues resembles archaeal inositol monophosphate dehydrogenases.

Kehres and Maguire suggest that the MgtE proteins are secondary carriers with inwardly directed polarity. Hattori et al. have considered MgtE to function by a channel mechanism, providing evidence that the MgtE cytosolic domain acts as a Mg^{2+} sensor to regulate gating of the pore in response to the intracellular Mg^{2+} concentration. This produces a mechanism for the maintenance of homeostasis conditions. The cytosolic domain of MgtE undergoes a Mg^{2+}-dependent structural change, which may gate the ion-conducting pore passing through the transmembrane domain.

Maruyama et al. showed that MgtE exhibits the channel-like electrophysiological properties, i.e., Mg^{2+} transport occurs in accordance to the electrochemical potential of Mg^{2+}. The Mg^{2+}-permeation pathway opens in response to a decrease of the intracellular Mg^{2+} concentration, while it is completely closed at the intracellular Mg^{2+} concentration of 10 mM. The crystal structures of the MgtE dimer reveal that the Mg^{2+}-sensing cytoplasmic region consists of the N and CBS domains. The Mg^{2+}-bound state adopts a compact, globular conformation, which is stabilized by the coordination of a number of Mg^{2+} ions between these domains. On the other hand, in the Mg^{2+}-unbound state, these domains are far apart, and fixed by the crystal packing.

== Transport Reaction ==
The transport reaction catalyzed by MgtE proteins is:

Mg^{2+} (or Co^{2+}) (out) → Mg^{2+} (or Co^{2+}) (in)
