= Pseudomonas sRNA P11 =

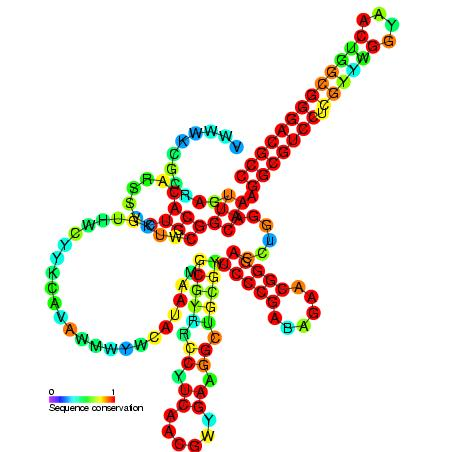
- Predicted secondary structure and sequence conservation of P11

Identifiers
- Symbol: P11
- Rfam: RF00625

Other data
- RNA type: Gene
- Domain(s): Bacteria
- SO: SO:0000655
- PDB structures: PDBe

Pseudomonas sRNA P11 is a ncRNA that was predicted using bioinformatic tools in the genome of the opportunistic pathogen Pseudomonas aeruginosa and its expression verified by northern blot analysis. P11 is located between a putative threonine protein kinase and putative nitrate reductase and is conserved in several Pseudomonas species. P11 has a predicted Rho independent terminator at the 3′ end but the function of P11 is unknown.

== See also ==
- Pseudomonas sRNA P1
- Pseudomonas sRNA P9
- Pseudomonas sRNA P15
- Pseudomonas sRNA P16
- Pseudomonas sRNA P24
- Pseudomonas sRNA P26
