= Pseudomonas sRNA P9 =

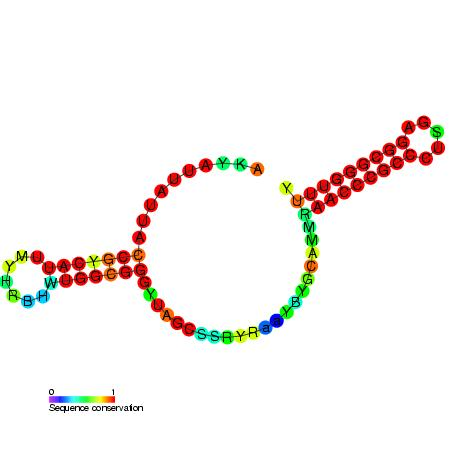
- Predicted secondary structure and sequence conservation of P9

Identifiers
- Symbol: P9
- Rfam: RF00624

Other data
- RNA type: Gene
- Domain(s): Bacteria
- SO: SO:0000655
- PDB structures: PDBe

Pseudomonas sRNA P9 is a ncRNA that was predicted using bioinformatic tools in the genome of the opportunistic pathogen Pseudomonas aeruginosa and its expression verified by northern blot analysis.

P9 appears to be conserved in several Pseudomonas species in addition to Bordetella species. In both Pseudomonas and Bordetella species P9 appears to be located upstream of a predicted threonine dehydratase gene. P9 has a predicted Rho independent terminator at the 3′ end but the function of P9 is unknown.

== See also ==
- Pseudomonas sRNA P1
- Pseudomonas sRNA P11
- Pseudomonas sRNA P15
- Pseudomonas sRNA P16
- Pseudomonas sRNA P24
- Pseudomonas sRNA P26
