= Pseudomonas rpsL leader =

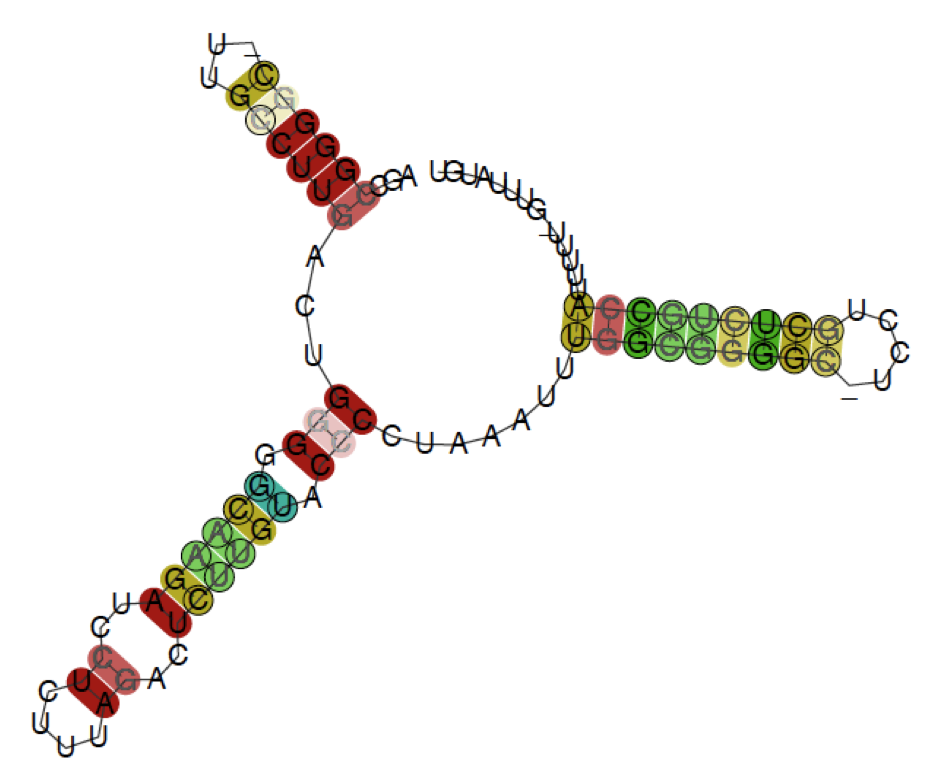
- Conserved secondary structure of rpsL leader showing the fraction of canonical base pairs

Identifiers
- Symbol: rpsL_pseudo
- Rfam: RF01773

Other data
- RNA type: Cis-reg; leader
- Domain(s): Pseudomonadaceae
- PDB structures: PDBe

The Pseudomonas rpsL leader is a putative attenuator RNA element identified by bioinformatics searches within bacteria of the Pseudomonadaceae phylum. It is located upstream of the operon encoding ribosomal proteins S12 and S7 (rpsL and rpsG genes respectively), and presents a Rho-independent terminator at the 3' end. This RNA is presumed to operate as a non-coding ribosomal protein leader potentially interacting with the S12 or S7 proteins, which are encoded by the operon. The motif might be related to other rpsL leaders, such as the Rickettsia rpsL leader.
