= CorA metal ion transporter =

CorA-like Mg2+ transporter protein
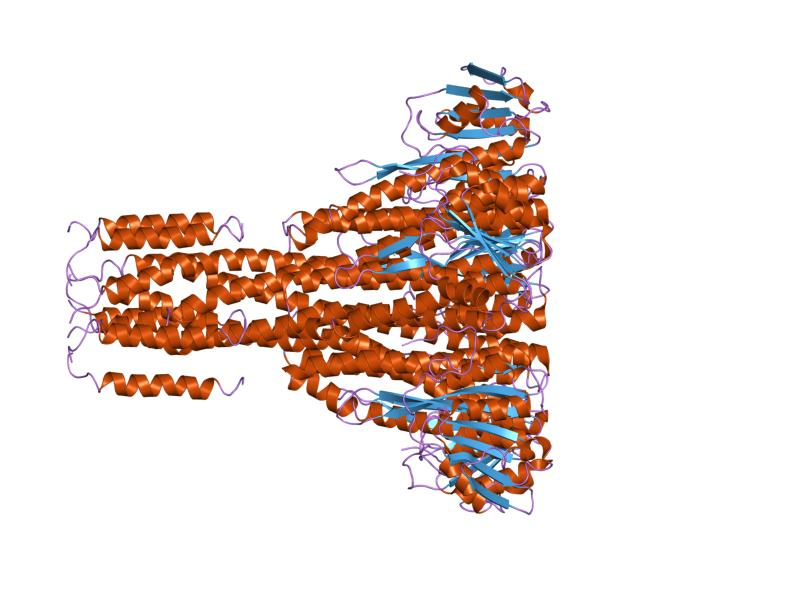
- Structure of the CorA Mg2+ transporter.

Identifiers
- Symbol: CorA
- Pfam: PF01544
- InterPro: IPR002523
- TCDB: 1.A.35
- OPM superfamily: 66
- OPM protein: 2bbj
- CDD: cd11744
Available protein structures:
- PDB: 2bbhA:56-266 2bbjD:56-351 IPR002523 PF01544 (ECOD; PDBsum)
- AlphaFold: IPR002523; PF01544

The CorA transport system is the primary Mg^{2+} influx system of Salmonella typhimurium and Escherichia coli. CorA is ubiquitous in the Bacteria and Archaea. There are also eukaryotic members of the family localized to the mitochondrial membrane such as MRS2 and Lpe10 in yeast.

== Subfamilies ==
- Magnesium and cobalt transport protein CorA InterPro: IPR004488

== Human proteins containing this domain ==
MRS2L;
