= Pseudomonas sRNA P16 =

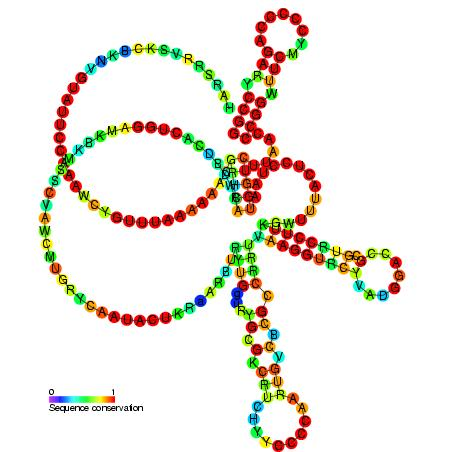
- Predicted secondary structure and sequence conservation of P16

Identifiers
- Symbol: P16
- Rfam: RF00628

Other data
- RNA type: Gene
- Domain: Bacteria
- SO: SO:0000655
- PDB structures: PDBe

Pseudomonas sRNA P16 is a ncRNA that was predicted using bioinformatic tools in the genome of the opportunistic pathogen Pseudomonas aeruginosa and its expression verified by northern blot analysis. P16 sRNA appears to be conserved across several Pseudomonas species and is consistently located downstream of a predicted TatD deoxyribonuclease gene. P16 has a predicted Rho independent terminator at the 3′ end but the function of P16 is unknown.

It has been shown that this sRNA is transcribed from an RpoS-dependent promoter under positive, probably indirect GacA control in two Pseudomonas species. It was renamed RgsA (for regulation by GacA and stress). RpoS mRNA expression is repressed by RgsA during the exponential phase. The Hfq RNA chaperone is required for the repression.

== See also ==
- Pseudomonas sRNA P1
- Pseudomonas sRNA P9
- Pseudomonas sRNA P11
- Pseudomonas sRNA P15
- Pseudomonas sRNA P24
- Pseudomonas sRNA P26
