= Pseudomonas sRNA P24 =

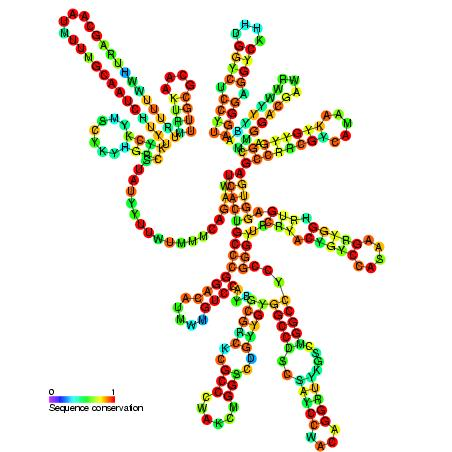
- Predicted secondary structure and sequence conservation of P24

Identifiers
- Symbol: P24
- Rfam: RF00629

Other data
- RNA type: Gene
- Domain(s): Bacteria
- SO: SO:0000655
- PDB structures: PDBe

Pseudomonas sRNA P24 is a ncRNA that was predicted using bioinformatic tools in the genome of the opportunistic pathogen Pseudomonas aeruginosa and its expression verified by northern blot analysis.

P24 is conserved across several Pseudomonas species and is consistently located between a hypothetical protein gene and a transcriptional regulator gene (AsnC family) in the genomes of these Pseudomonas species. P24 has a predicted Rho independent terminatorat the 3′ end but the function of P24 is unknown.

== See also ==
- Pseudomonas sRNA P9
- Pseudomonas sRNA P11
- Pseudomonas sRNA P15
- Pseudomonas sRNA P16
- Pseudomonas sRNA P26
