= WebGeSTer =

WebGeSTer DB

Content
- Description: transcription terminator database.

Contact
- Research center: Indian Institute of Science and Jawaharlal Nehru Centre for Advanced Scientific Research, Bangalore, India
- Laboratory: Department of Microbiology Cell Biology
- Authors: Anirban Mitra, Anil Kesarwani, Debnath Pal and Valakunja Nagaraja
- Primary citation: Mitra & al. (2011)
- Release date: 2010

Access
- Website: http://pallab.serc.iisc.ernet.in/gester

WebGeSTer DB is a database of intrinsic transcription terminators

== See also ==
- Intrinsic termination
