= Pseudomonas sRNA P26 =

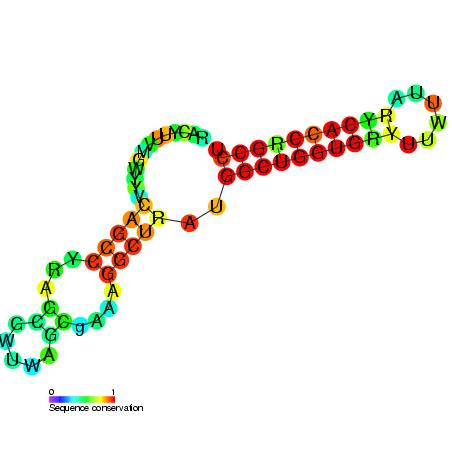
- Predicted secondary structure and sequence conservation of P26

Identifiers
- Symbol: P26
- Rfam: RF00630

Other data
- RNA type: Gene
- Domain(s): Bacteria
- SO: SO:0000655
- PDB structures: PDBe

Pseudomonas sRNA P26 is a ncRNA that was predicted using bioinformatic tools in the genome of the opportunistic pathogen Pseudomonas aeruginosa and its expression verified by northern blot analysis. P26 is conserved across many Gammaproteobacteria species and appears to be consistently located between the DNA directed RNA polymerase (beta subunit) and 50S ribosomal protein L7/L12 genes.

== See also ==
- Pseudomonas sRNA P9
- Pseudomonas sRNA P11
- Pseudomonas sRNA P15
- Pseudomonas sRNA P16
- Pseudomonas sRNA P24
- Pseudomonas sRNA P1
