= CLDN19 =

Protein-coding gene in humans

Identifiers
- Aliases: CLDN19, HOMG5, claudin 19
- External IDs: OMIM: 610036; MGI: 3033992; GeneCards: CLDN19
Available structures
PDB	Ortholog search: PDBe RCSB
PDB	List of PDB id codes 3X29

Gene location (Human)
Chr.	Chromosome 1 (human)
Band	1p34.2	Start	42,733,093 bp
Band	1p34.2	End	42,740,254 bp

Gene location (Mouse)
Chr.	Chromosome 4 (mouse)
Band	4|4 D2.1	Start	119,112,611 bp
Band	4|4 D2.1	End	119,119,635 bp
RNA expression pattern
Bgee	Human / Mouse (ortholog); Top expressed in: trigeminal ganglion; spinal ganglia; retinal pigment epithelium; renal medulla; tibial nerve; vena cava; epithelium of nasopharynx; body of tongue; ventral tegmental area; trachea / Top expressed in: sciatic nerve; right kidney; inner renal medulla; outer renal medulla; spinal ganglia; lip; human kidney; lens; embryo; muscle of thigh; More reference expression data
BioGPS	n/a
Gene ontology
Molecular function	structural molecule activity; identical protein binding; protein binding
Cellular component	cytoplasm; integral component of membrane; cell junction; plasma membrane; basolateral plasma membrane; apical junction complex; nucleus; bicellular tight junction; membrane
Biological process	calcium-independent cell-cell adhesion via plasma membrane cell-adhesion molecules; apical junction assembly; neuronal action potential propagation; response to stimulus; visual perception; tight junction organization
Sources:Amigo / QuickGO
Orthologs
Databases	NCBI: entry; OMA: entry
Species	Human	Mouse
Entrez	149461	242653
Ensembl	ENSG00000164007	ENSMUSG00000066058
UniProt	Q8N6F1	Q9ET38
RefSeq (mRNA)	NM_148960; NM_001123395; NM_001185117	NM_001038590; NM_153105
RefSeq (protein)	NP_001116867; NP_001172046; NP_683763	NP_001033679; NP_694745
Location (UCSC)	Chr 1: 42.73 – 42.74 Mb	Chr 4: 119.11 – 119.12 Mb
PubMed search
- Wikidata
View/Edit Human	View/Edit Mouse

Claudin-19 is a protein that in humans is encoded by the CLDN19 gene. It belongs to the group of claudins. Claudin-19 has been implicated in magnesium transport.

Claudins, such as CLDN19, are transmembrane proteins found at tight junctions. Tight junctions form barriers that control the passage of ions and molecules across an epithelial sheet and the movement of proteins and lipids between apical and basolateral domains of epithelial cells (Lee et al., 2006).[supplied by OMIM]
