= MRS2 =

Protein-coding gene in humans

Identifiers
- Aliases: MRS2, HPT, MRS2L, magnesium transporter, magnesium transporter MRS2
- External IDs: MGI: 2685748; GeneCards: MRS2

Gene location (Human)
Chr.	Chromosome 6 (human)
Band	6p22.3	Start	24,402,908 bp
Band	6p22.3	End	24,426,194 bp

Gene location (Mouse)
Chr.	Chromosome 13 (mouse)
Band	13|13 A3.1	Start	25,171,466 bp
Band	13|13 A3.1	End	25,204,362 bp
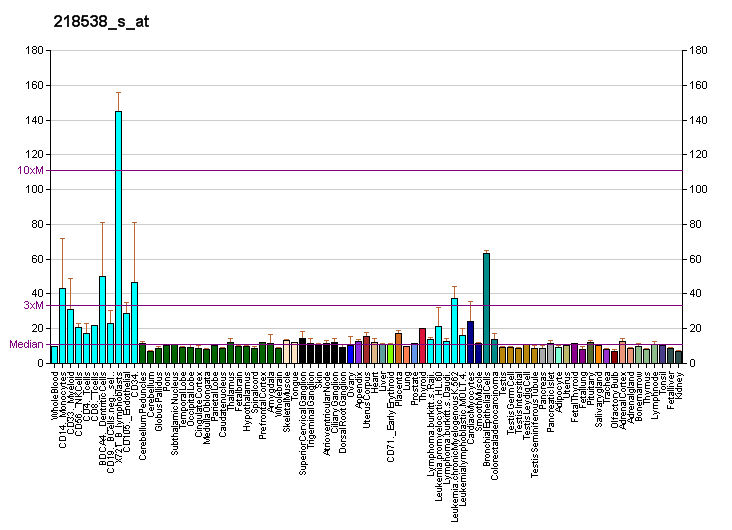

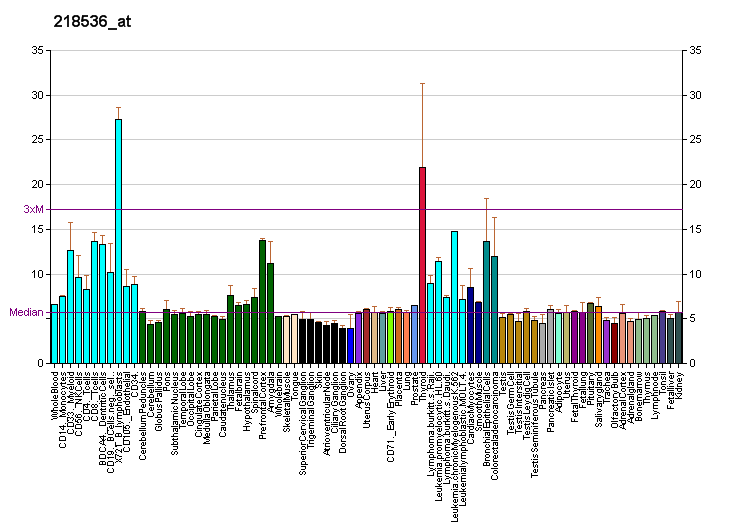
RNA expression pattern
Bgee	Human / Mouse (ortholog); Top expressed in: biceps brachii; Skeletal muscle tissue of biceps brachii; gastrocnemius muscle; left ventricle; right ventricle; muscle of thigh; right auricle of heart; cerebellar hemisphere; right hemisphere of cerebellum; apex of heart / Top expressed in: spermatocyte; retinal pigment epithelium; spermatid; neural layer of retina; Paneth cell; Epithelium of choroid plexus; lacrimal gland; substantia nigra; ciliary body; Region I of hippocampus proper; More reference expression data
BioGPS	More reference expression data
Gene ontology
Molecular function	magnesium ion transmembrane transporter activity
Cellular component	integral component of membrane; mitochondrial inner membrane; membrane; mitochondrion
Biological process	ion transport; transmembrane transport; lactate metabolic process; mitochondrial magnesium ion transmembrane transport; magnesium ion transport
Sources:Amigo / QuickGO
Orthologs
Databases	NCBI: entry; OMA: entry
Species	Human	Mouse
Entrez	57380	380836
Ensembl	ENSG00000124532	ENSMUSG00000021339
UniProt	Q9HD23	Q5NCE8
RefSeq (mRNA)	NM_001286264; NM_001286265; NM_001286266; NM_020662	NM_001013389
RefSeq (protein)	NP_001273193; NP_001273194; NP_001273195; NP_065713	NP_001013407
Location (UCSC)	Chr 6: 24.4 – 24.43 Mb	Chr 13: 25.17 – 25.2 Mb
PubMed search
- Wikidata
View/Edit Human	View/Edit Mouse

Magnesium transporter MRS2 homolog, mitochondrial is a protein that in humans is encoded by the MRS2 gene. This protein functions to transport magnesium across the mitochondrial membrane.
