= SLC41A1 =

Protein found in humans

Identifiers
- Aliases: SLC41A1, MgtE, solute carrier family 41 member 1, NPHPL2
- External IDs: OMIM: 610801; MGI: 2444823; GeneCards: SLC41A1

Gene location (Human)
Chr.	Chromosome 1 (human)
Band	1q32.1	Start	205,789,094 bp
Band	1q32.1	End	205,813,748 bp

Gene location (Mouse)
Chr.	Chromosome 1 (mouse)
Band	1|1 E4	Start	131,755,231 bp
Band	1|1 E4	End	131,776,603 bp
RNA expression pattern
Bgee	Human / Mouse (ortholog); Top expressed in: myocardium of left ventricle; cardiac muscle tissue of right atrium; apex of heart; right ventricle; right auricle of heart; tibialis anterior muscle; body of tongue; body of pancreas; vena cava; Skeletal muscle tissue of biceps brachii / Top expressed in: extraocular muscle; digastric muscle; saccule; stria vascularis; optic nerve; soleus muscle; thoracic diaphragm; sternocleidomastoid muscle; ciliary body; plantaris muscle; More reference expression data
BioGPS	n/a
Gene ontology
Molecular function	cation transmembrane transporter activity; magnesium ion transmembrane transporter activity; magnesium:sodium antiporter activity; transmembrane transporter activity
Cellular component	integral component of membrane; membrane; plasma membrane; basolateral plasma membrane; protein-containing complex
Biological process	cation transport; ion transport; sodium ion transmembrane transport; magnesium ion transmembrane transport; cellular magnesium ion homeostasis; magnesium ion transport; cellular response to magnesium ion
Sources:Amigo / QuickGO
Orthologs
Databases	NCBI: entry; OMA: entry
Species	Human	Mouse
Entrez	254428	98396
Ensembl	ENSG00000133065	ENSMUSG00000013275
UniProt	Q8IVJ1	Q8BJA2
RefSeq (mRNA)	NM_173854	NM_173865
RefSeq (protein)	NP_776253	NP_776290
Location (UCSC)	Chr 1: 205.79 – 205.81 Mb	Chr 1: 131.76 – 131.78 Mb
PubMed search
- Wikidata
View/Edit Human	View/Edit Mouse

SLC41A1 is a protein that in humans is encoded by the gene SLC41A1. It is homologous to the prokaryotic Mg++ transfer protein MgtE

Mutations in this gene have been associated with Nephronophthisis-like phenotypes.
