= Mg2+-importing ATPase =

Class of enzymes

magnesium-importing ATPase

Identifiers
- EC no.: 3.6.3.2

Databases
- IntEnz: IntEnz view
- BRENDA: BRENDA entry
- ExPASy: NiceZyme view
- KEGG: KEGG entry
- MetaCyc: metabolic pathway
- PRIAM: profile
- PDB structures: RCSB PDB PDBe PDBsum
- Gene Ontology: AmiGO / QuickGO
Search
- PMC: articles
- PubMed: articles
- NCBI: proteins

In enzymology, a Mg^{2+}-importing ATPase (EC 3.6.3.2) is an enzyme that catalyzes the chemical reaction

ATP + H_{2}O + Mg_{2}+out $\rightleftharpoons$ ADP + phosphate + Mg_{2}+in

The 3 substrates of this enzyme are ATP, H_{2}O, and Mg^{2+}, whereas its 3 products are ADP, phosphate, and Mg^{2+}.

This enzyme belongs to the family of hydrolases, specifically those acting on acid anhydrides to catalyse transmembrane movement of substances. The systematic name of this enzyme class is ATP phosphohydrolase (Mg^{2+}-importing).

The mgtA gene which encodes this enzyme is thought to be regulated by a magnesium responsive RNA element. A human enzyme was found in erythrocytes but the observation could not be confirmed.
