= Myxopyronin =

Group of chemical compounds

Myxopyronins (Myx) are a group of alpha-pyrone antibiotics, which are inhibitors of bacterial RNA polymerase (RNAP). They target switch 1 and switch 2 of the RNAP "switch region". Rifamycins and fidaxomicin also target RNAP, but target different sites in RNAP. Myxopyronins do not have cross-resistance with any other drugs so myxopyronins may be useful to address the growing problem of drug resistance in tuberculosis. They also may be useful in treatment of methicillin-resistant Staphylococcus aureus (MRSA). They are in pre-clinical development and has not yet started clinical trials.

Myxopyronin was first isolated in 1983 from a soil bacterium by Werner Kohl and Herbert Irschik at the Helmholtz Centre for Infection Research (former GBF). A total synthesis of myxopyronin was first reported in 1998 by James S. Panek and co-workers.

The target, the mechanism of action, and the structure of the complex of RNAP with myxopyronin were first reported in 2008 by Richard H. Ebright and co-workers. Synthetic analogs of the natural myxopyronins have been synthesized at Anadys Pharmaceuticals and at Rutgers University.

Terence I. Moy and co-workers at Cubist Pharmaceuticals have stated that, based on high resistance rate and high serum protein binding (comparable to rifamycins and lipiarmycin), the unmodified natural product myxopyronin B is not a viable starting point for antibiotic development.

Chemical structures of myxopyronin A (left) and myxopyronin B (right)
