= Magnesium transporter =

Magnesium transporters are proteins that transport magnesium across the cell membrane. All forms of life require magnesium, yet the molecular mechanisms of Mg^{2+} uptake from the environment and the distribution of this vital element within the organism are only slowly being elucidated.

The ATPase function of MgtA is highly cardiolipin dependent and has been shown to detect free magnesium in the μM range.

In bacteria, Mg^{2+} is probably mainly supplied by the CorA protein and, where the CorA protein is absent, by the MgtE protein. In yeast the initial uptake is via the Alr1p and Alr2p proteins, but at this stage the only internal Mg^{2+} distributing protein identified is Mrs2p. Within the protozoa only one Mg^{2+} transporter (XntAp) has been identified. In metazoa, Mrs2p and MgtE homologues have been identified, along with two novel Mg^{2+} transport systems TRPM6/TRPM7 and PCLN-1. Finally, in plants, a family of Mrs2p homologues has been identified along with another novel protein, AtMHX.

== Evolution ==
The evolution of Mg^{2+} transport appears to have been rather complicated. Proteins apparently based on MgtE are present in bacteria and metazoa, but are missing in fungi and plants, whilst proteins apparently related to CorA are present in all of these groups. The two active transport transporters present in bacteria, MgtA and MgtB, do not appear to have any homologies in higher organisms. There are also Mg^{2+} transport systems that are found only in the higher organisms.

== Types ==
There are a large number of proteins yet to be identified that transport Mg^{2+}. Even in the best studied eukaryote, yeast, Borrelly has reported a Mg^{2+}/H^{+} exchanger without an associated protein, which is probably localised to the Golgi. At least one other major Mg^{2+} transporter in yeast is still unaccounted for, the one affecting Mg^{2+} transport in and out of the yeast vacuole. In higher, multicellular organisms, it seems that many Mg^{2+} transporting proteins await discovery.

The CorA-domain-containing Mg^{2+} transporters (CorA, Alr-like and Mrs2-like) have a similar but not identical array of affinities for divalent cations. In fact, this observation can be extended to all of the Mg^{2+} transporters identified so far. This similarity suggests that the basic properties of Mg^{2+} strongly influence the possible mechanisms of recognition and transport. However, this observation also suggests that using other metal ions as tracers for Mg^{2+} uptake will not necessarily produce results comparable to the transporter's ability to transport Mg^{2+}. Ideally, Mg^{2+} should be measured directly.

Since ^{28}Mg^{2+} is practically unobtainable, much of the old data will need to be reinterpreted with new tools for measuring Mg^{2+} transport, if different transporters are to be compared directly. The pioneering work of Kolisek and Froschauer using mag-fura 2 has shown that free Mg^{2+} can be reliably measured in vivo in some systems. By returning to the analysis of CorA with this new tool, we have gained an important baseline for the analysis of new Mg^{2+} transport systems as they are discovered. However, it is important that the amount of transporter present in the membrane is accurately determined if comparisons of transport capability are to be made. This bacterial system might also be able to provide some utility for the analysis of eukaryotic Mg^{2+} transport proteins, but differences in biological systems of prokaryotes and eukaryotes will have to be considered in any experiment.

== Function ==
Comparing the functions of the characterised Mg^{2+} transport proteins is currently almost impossible, even though the proteins have been investigated in different biological systems using different methodologies and technologies. Finding a system where all the proteins can be compared directly would be a major advance. If the proteins could be shown to be functional in bacteria (S. typhimurium), then a combination of the techniques of mag-fura 2, quantification of protein in the envelope membrane, and structure of the proteins (X-ray crystal or cryo-TEM) might allow the determination of the basic mechanisms involved in the recognition and transport of the Mg^{2+} ion. However, perhaps the best advance would be the development of methods allowing the measurement of the protein's function in the patch-clamp system using artificial membranes.

== Bacteria ==
=== Early research ===
In 1968, Lusk described the limitation of bacterial (Escherichia coli) growth on Mg^{2+}-poor media, suggesting that bacteria required Mg^{2+} and were likely to actively take this ion from the environment. The following year, the same group and another group, Silver, independently described the uptake and efflux of Mg^{2+} in metabolically active E. coli cells using ^{28}Mg^{2+}. By the end of 1971, two papers had been published describing the interference of Co^{2+}, Ni^{2+} and Mn^{2+} on the transport of Mg^{2+} in E. coli and in Aerobacter aerogenes and Bacillus megaterium. In the last major development before the cloning of the genes encoding the transporters, it was discovered that there was a second Mg^{2+} uptake system that showed similar affinity and transport kinetics to the first system, but had a different range of sensitivities to interfering cations. This system was also repressible by high extracellular concentrations of Mg^{2+} .

=== CorA ===
The CorA gene and its corresponding protein are the most exhaustively studied Mg^{2+} transport system in any organism. Most of the published literature on the CorA gene comes from the laboratory of M. E. Maguire. Recently the group of R. J. Schweyen made a significant impact on the understanding of Mg^{2+} transport by CorA. The gene was originally named after the cobalt-resistant phenotype in E. coli that was caused by the gene's inactivation.

The gene was genetically identified in E. coli by Park et al., but wasn't cloned until Hmiel et al. isolated the Salmonella enterica serovar Typhimurium (S. typhimurium) homologue. Later it would be shown by Smith and Maguire that the CorA gene was present in 17 gram-negative bacteria. With the large number of complete genome sequences now available for prokaryotes, CorA has been shown to be virtually ubiquitous among the Eubacteria, as well as being widely distributed among the Archaea. The CorA locus in E. coli contains a single open reading frame of 948 nucleotides, producing a protein of 316 amino acids. This protein is well conserved amongst the Eubacteria and Archaea. Between E. coli and S. typhimurium, the proteins are 98% identical, but in more distantly related species, the similarity falls to between 15 and 20%. In the more distantly related genes, the similarity is often restricted to the C-terminal part of the protein, and a short amino acid motif GMN within this region is very highly conserved. The CorA domain, also known as PF01544 in the pFAM conserved protein domain database (http://webarchive.loc.gov/all/20110506030957/http%3A//pfam.sanger.ac.uk/), is additionally present in a wide range of higher organisms, and these transporters will be reviewed below.

The CorA gene is constitutively expressed in S. typhimurium under a wide range of external Mg^{2+} concentrations. However, recent evidence suggests that the activity of the protein may be regulated by the PhoPQ two-component regulatory system. This sensor responds to low external Mg^{2+} concentrations during the infection process of S. typhimurium in humans. In low external Mg^{2+} conditions, the PhoPQ system was reported to suppress the function of CorA and it has been previously shown that the transcription of the alternative Mg^{2+} transporters MgtA and MgtB is activated in these conditions. Chamnongpol and Groisman suggest that this allows the bacteria to escape metal ion toxicity caused by the transport of other ions, particularly Fe(II), by CorA in the absence of Mg^{2+}. Papp and Maguire offer a conflicting report on the source of the toxicity.

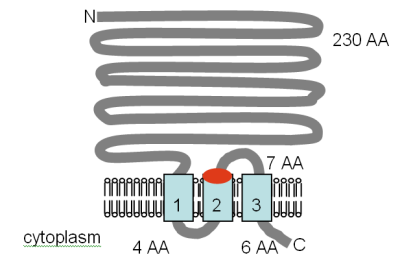
The originally published TM topology of the CorA protein

The figure (not to scale) shows the originally published transmembrane (TM) domain topology of the S. typhimurium CorA protein, which was said to have three membrane-spanning regions in the C-terminal part of the protein (shown in blue), as determined by Smith et al.. Evidence for CorA acting as a homotetramer was published by Warren et al. in 2004. In December 2005 the crystal structure of the CorA channel was posted to the RSCB protein structure database. The results showed that the protein has two TM domains and exists as a homopentamer, in direct conflict with the earlier reports. Follow this link to see the structure in 3D. The soluble intracellular parts of the protein are highly charged, containing 31 positively charged and 53 negatively charged residues. Conversely, the TM domains contain only one charged amino acid, which has been shown to be unimportant in the activity of the transporter. From mutagenesis experiments, it appears that the chemistry of the Mg^{2+} transport relies on the hydroxyl groups lining the inside of the transport pore; there is also an absolute requirement for the GMN motif (shown in red).

Before the activity of CorA could be studied in vivo, any other Mg^{2+} transport systems in the bacterial host had to be identified and inactivated or deleted (see below). A strain of S. typhimurium containing a functional CorA gene but lacking MgtA and MgtB was constructed(also see below), and the uptake kinetics of the transporter were analysed. This strain showed nearly normal growth rates on standard media (50 μM Mg^{2+}), but the removal of all three genes created a bacterial strain requiring 100 mM external Mg^{2+} for normal growth.

Mg^{2+} is transported into cells containing only the CorA transport system with similar kinetics and cation sensitivities as the Mg^{2+} uptake described in the earlier papers, and has additionally been quantified(see table). The uptake of Mg^{2+} was seen to plateau as in earlier studies, and although no actual mechanism for the decrease in transport has been determined, so it has been assumed that the protein is inactivated. Co^{2+} and Ni^{2+} are toxic to S. typhimurium cells containing a functional CorA protein and this toxicity stems from the blocking of Mg^{2+} uptake (competitive inhibition) and the accumulation of these ions inside the cell. Co^{2+} and Ni^{2+} have been shown to be transported by CorA by using radioactive tracer analysis, although with lower affinities (km) and velocities (Vmax) than for Mg^{2+} (see table). The km values for Co^{2+} and Ni^{2+} are significantly above those expected to be encountered by the cells in their normal environment, so it is unlikely that the CorA transport system mediates the uptake of these ions under natural conditions. To date, the evidence for Mn^{2+} transport by CorA is limited to E. coli.

	Mg^{2+}	Co^{2+}	Ni^{2+}
km (μM)	15	30	240
Vmax (pmol/min/10^{8} cells)	250	500	360
Ki (μM) - Mg	-	-	10
Ki (μM) - Co	50	-	20
Ki (μM) - Mn	30	-	-
Ki (μM) - Ni	300	-	300

The table lists the transport kinetics of the CorA Mg^{2+} transport system. This table has been compiled from the publications of Snavely et al. (1989b), Gibson et al. (1991) and Smith et al. (1998a) and summarises the kinetic data for the CorA transport protein expressed from the wild type promoter in bacteria lacking MgtA and MgtB. km and Vmax were determined at 20 °C as the uptake of Mg^{2+} at 37 °C was too rapid to measure accurately.

Recently the Mg^{2+}-dependent fluorescence of mag-fura 2 was used to measure the free Mg^{2+} content of S. typhimurium cells in response to external Mg^{2+}, which showed that CorA is the major uptake system for Mg^{2+} in bacteria. The authors also showed for the first time that the changes in the electric potential (ΔΨ) across the plasma membrane of the cell affected both the rate of Mg^{2+} uptake and the free Mg^{2+} content of the cell; depolarisation suppressed transport, while hyperpolarisation increased transport. The kinetics of transport were defined only by the rate of change of free Mg^{2+} inside the cells (250 μM s^{−1}). Because no quantification of the amount of CorA protein in the membrane was made, this value cannot be compared with other experiments on Mg^{2+} transporters.

The efflux of Mg^{2+} from bacterial cells was first observed by Lusk and Kennedy (1969) and is mediated by the CorA Mg^{2+} transport system in the presence of high extracellular concentrations of Mg^{2+}. The efflux can also be triggered by Co^{2+}, Mn^{2+} and Ni^{2+}, although not to the same degree as Mg^{2+}. No Co^{2+} efflux through the CorA transport system was observed. The process of Mg^{2+} efflux additionally requires one of the CorB, CorC or CorD genes. The mutation of any single one of these genes leads to a Co^{2+} resistance a little less than half of that provided by a CorA mutant. This effect may be due to the inhibition of Mg^{2+} loss that would otherwise occur in the presence of high levels of Co^{2+}. It is currently unknown whether Mg^{2+} is more toxic when the CorBCD genes are deleted.

It has been speculated that the Mg^{2+} ion will initially interact with any transport protein through its hydration shell. Cobalt (III) hexaammine, Co(III)Hex, is a covalently bound (non-labile) analog for the first shell of hydration for several divalent cations, including Mg^{2+}. The radius of the Co(III)Hex molecule is 244 pm, very similar to the 250 pm radius of the first hydration shell of Mg^{2+}. This analog is a potent inhibitor of the CorA transport system, more so than Mg^{2+}, Co^{2+} or Ni^{2+}. The additional strength of the Co(III)Hex inhibition might come from the blocking of the transport pore due to the inability of the protein to 'dehydrate' the substrate. It was also shown that Co(III)Hex was not transported into the cells, suggesting that at least partial dehydration would be required for the transport of the normal substrate (Mg^{2+}). Nickel (II) hexaammine, with a radius of 255 pm, did not inhibit the CorA transport system, suggesting a maximum size limit exists for the binding of the CorA substrate ion. These results suggest that the important property involved in the recognition of Mg^{2+} by CorA is the size of the ion with its first shell of hydration. Hence, the volume change generally quoted for the bare to hydrated Mg^{2+} ion of greater than 500-fold, including the second sphere of hydration, may not be biologically relevant, and may be a reason for the first sphere volume change of 56-fold to be more commonly used.

=== MgtA and MgtB ===
The presence of these two genes was first suspected when Nelson and Kennedy (1972) showed that there were Mg^{2+}-repressible and non-repressible Mg^{2+} uptake systems in E. coli. The non-repressible uptake of Mg^{2+} is mediated by the CorA protein. In S. typhimurium the repressible Mg^{2+} uptake was eventually shown to be via the MgtA and MgtB proteins.

Both MgtA and MgtB are regulated by the PhoPQ system and are actively transcribed during the process of infection of human patients by S. typhimurium. Although neither gene is required for pathogenicity, the MgtB protein does enhance the long-term survival of the pathogen in the cell. The genes are also upregulated in vitro when the Mg^{2+} concentration falls below 50 μM (Snavely et al., 1991a). Although the proteins have km values similar to CorA and transport rates approximately 10 times less, the genes may be part of a Mg^{2+} scavenging system. Chamnongpol and Groisman (2002) presents evidence that the role of these proteins may be to compensate for the inactivation of the CorA protein by the PhoPQ regulon. The authors suggest that the CorA protein is inactivated to allow the avoidance of metal toxicity via the protein in the low Mg^{2+} environments S. typhimurium is subjected to by cells after infection.

The proteins are both P-type ATPases and neither gene shows any similarity to CorA. The MgtA and MgtB proteins are 75% similar (50% identical), although it seems that MgtB may have been acquired by horizontal gene transfer as part of Salmonella Pathogenicity Island 3. The TM topology of the MgtB protein has been experimentally determined, showing that the protein has ten TM-spanning helices with the termini of the protein in the cytoplasm (see figure ). MgtA is present in widely divergent bacteria, but is not nearly as common as CorA, while MgtB appears to have a quite restricted distribution. No hypotheses for the unusual distribution have been suggested.

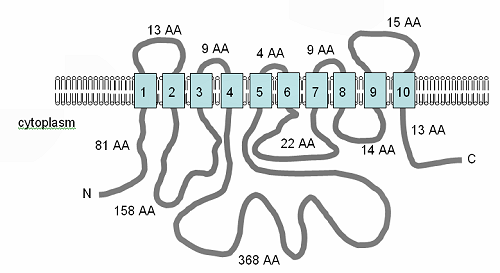
The TM topology of the MgtB protein

The figure, adapted from Smith et al. (1993b), shows the experimentally determined membrane topology of the MgtB protein in S. typhimurium. The TM domains are shown in light blue and the orientation in the membrane and the positions of the N- and C-termini are indicated. The figure is not drawn to scale.

While the MgtA and MgtB proteins are very similar, they do show some minor differences in activity. MgtB is very sensitive to temperature, losing all activity (with regard to Mg^{2+} transport) at a temperature of 20 °C. Additionally, MgtB and MgtA are inhibited by different ranges of cations (Table A10.1).

The table lists cation transport characteristics of the MgtA and MgtB proteins in S. typhimurium as well as the kinetic data for the MgtA and MgtB transport proteins at 37 °C. The Vmax numbers listed in parentheses are those for uptake at 20 °C. The inhibition of Mg^{2+} transport by Mn^{2+} via MgtA showed unusual kinetics (see Figure 1 of Snavely et al., 1989b)

	Mg^{2+}		Co^{2+}		
	km (μM)	Vmax (pmol/min/10^{8} cells)	Ki (μM)		
			Co^{2+}	Mn^{2+}	Ni^{2+}
MgtA	29	115(24)	40	x	30
MgtB	6	75(<2)	8	40	13

The MgtA and MgtB proteins are ATPases, using one molecule of ATP per transport cycle, whereas the Mg^{2+} uptake via CorA is simply electrochemically favourable. Chamnongpol and Groisman (2002) have suggested that the MgtA and MgtB proteins form part of a metal toxicity avoidance system. Alternatively, as most P-type ATPases function as efflux mediating transporters, it has been suggested that the MgtA and MgtB proteins act as efflux proteins for a currently unidentified cation, and Mg^{2+} transport is either non-specific or exchanged to maintain the electro-neutrality of the transport process. Further experiments will be required to define the physiological function of these proteins.

=== MgtE ===
MgtE
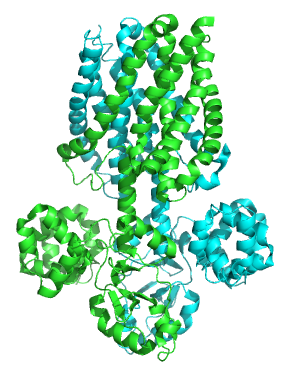
- Crystal structure of magnesium transporter MgtE. PDB 2zy9

Identifiers
- Symbol: MgtE
- Pfam: PF01769
- InterPro: IPR006667
- TCDB: 1.A.26
- OPM protein: 2yvx
Available protein structures:
- PDB: IPR006667 PF01769 (ECOD; PDBsum)
- AlphaFold: IPR006667; PF01769

Two papers describe MgtE, a fourth Mg^{2+} uptake protein in bacteria unrelated to MgtA/B or CorA. This gene has been sequenced and the protein, 312 amino acids in size, is predicted to contain either four or five TM spanning domains that are closely arranged in the C-terminal part of the protein (see figure). This region of the protein has been identified in the Pfam database as a conserved protein domain (PF01769) and species containing proteins that have this protein domain are roughly equally distributed throughout the Eubacteria and Archaea, although it is quite rare in comparison with the distribution of CorA. However, the diversity of the proteins containing the domain is significantly larger than that of the CorA domain. The Pfam database lists seven distinct groups of MgtE domain containing proteins, of which six contain an archaic or eubacterial member. The expression of MgtE is frequently controlled by a conserved RNA structure, YkoK leader or M-box.

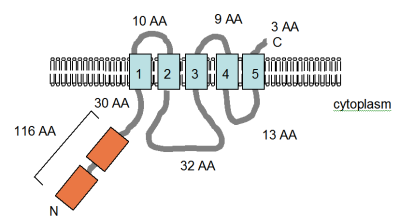
The predicted TM topology of the MgtE protein

The figure (right), adapted from Smith et al. (1995) and the PFAM database entry, shows the computer-predicted membrane topology of the MgtE protein in Bacillus firmus OF4. The TM domains are shown in light blue. The CBS domains, named for the protein they were identified in, cystathionine-beta synthase, shown in orange, are identified in the Pfam database as regulatory domains, but the mechanism of action has not yet been described. They are found in several voltage-gated chloride channels. The orientation in the membrane and the positions of the N- and C-termini are indicated. This figure is not drawn to scale. This transporter has recently had its structure solved by x-ray crystallography.

The MgtE gene was first identified by Smith et al. (1995) during a screen for CorA-like proteins in bacteria and complements the Mg^{2+}-uptake-deficient S. typhimurium strain MM281 (corA mgtA mgtB), restoring wild type growth on standard media. The kinetics of Mg^{2+} transport for the protein were not determined, as ^{28}Mg^{2+} was unavailable. As a substitute, the uptake of ^{57}Co^{2+} was measured and was shown to have a km of 82 μM and a Vmax of 354 pmol min^{−1} 10^{8} cells^{−1}. Mg^{2+} was a competitive inhibitor with a Ki of 50 μM—the Ki of Mg^{2+} inhibition of ^{60}Co^{2+} uptake via CorA is 10 μM. A comparison of the available kinetic data for MgtA and CorA is shown in the table. Clearly, MgtE does not transport Co^{2+} to the same degree as CorA, and the inhibition of transport by Mg^{2+} is also less efficient, which suggests that the affinity of MgtE for Mg^{2+} is lower than that of CorA. The strongest inhibitor of Co^{2+} uptake was Zn^{2+}, with a Ki of 20 μM. The transport of Zn^{2+} by this protein may be as important as that of Mg^{2+}.

	Mg^{2+}		Co^{2+}		
	km (μM)	Vmax (pmol/min/10^{8} cells)	km (μM)	Vmax (pmol/min/10^{8} cells)	Ki(Mg^{2+}) (μM)
MgtE	-	-	82 (at 37 °C)	354 (at 37 °C)	50 (at 37 °C)
CorA	15 (at 20 °C)	250 (at 20 °C)	30 (at 22 °C)	500 (at 22 °C)	10 (at 22 °C)

The table shows a comparison of the transport kinetics of MgtE and CorA, and key kinetic parameter values for them are listed. As shown, the data has been generated at differing incubation temperatures. km and Ki are not significantly altered by the differing incubation temperature. Conversely, Vmax shows a strong positive correlation with temperature, hence the value of Co^{2+} Vmax for MgtE is not directly comparable with the values for CorA.

== Yeast ==
=== Early research ===
The earliest research showing that yeast takes up Mg^{2+} appears to be done by Schmidt et al. (1949). However, these authors only showed altered yeast Mg^{2+} content in a table within the paper, and the report's conclusions dealt entirely with the metabolism of phosphate. A series of experiments by Rothstein shifted the focus more towards the uptake of the metal cations, showing that yeast take up cations with the following affinity series; Mg^{2+}, Co^{2+}, Zn^{2+} > Mn^{2+} > Ni^{2+} > Ca^{2+} > Sr^{2+}. Additionally, it was suggested that the transport of the different cations is mediated by the same transport system — a situation very much like that in bacteria.

In 1998, MacDiarmid and Gardner finally identified the proteins responsible for the observed cation transport phenotype in Saccharomyces cerevisiae. The genes involved in this system and a second mitochondrial Mg^{2+} transport system, functionally identified significantly after the gene was cloned, are described in the sections below.

=== ALR1 and ALR2 ===
Two genes, ALR1 and ALR2, were isolated in a screen for Al^{3+} tolerance (resistance) in yeast. Over-expression constructs containing yeast genomic DNA were introduced into wild type yeast and the transformants were screened for growth on toxic levels of Al^{3+}. ALR1 and ALR2 containing plasmids allowed the growth of yeast in these conditions.

The Alr1p and Alr2p proteins consist of 859 and 858 amino acids respectively and are 70% identical. In a region in the C-terminal, half of these proteins are weakly similar to the full CorA protein. The computer-predicted TM topology of Alr1p is shown in the figure. The presence of a third TM domain was suggested by MacDiarmid and Gardner (1998), on the strength on sequence homology, and more recently by Lee and Gardner (2006), on the strength of mutagenesis studies, making the TM topology of these proteins more like that of CorA (see figure). Also, Alr1p contains the conserved GMN motif at the outside end of TM 2 (TM 2') and the mutation of the methionine (M) in this motif to a leucine (L) led to the loss of transport capability.

The figure shows the two possible TM topologies of Alr1p. Part A of the figure shows the computer-predicted membrane topology of the Alr1p protein in yeast and part B shows the topology of Alr1p based on the experimental results of Lee and Gardner (2006). The GMN motif location is indicated in red and the TM domains in light blue. The orientation in the membrane and the positions of the N- and C-termini are indicated, the various sizes of the soluble domains are given in amino acids (AA), and TM domains are numbered by their similarity to CorA. Where any TM domain is missing, the remaining domains are numbered with primes. The figure is not drawn to scale. A third ALR-like gene is present in S. cerevisiae and there are two homologous genes in both Schizosaccharomyces pombe and Neurospora crassa. These proteins contain a GMN motif like that of CorA, with the exception of the second N. crassa gene. No ALR-like genes have been identified in species outside of the fungi.

Membrane fractionation and green fluorescent protein (GFP) fusion studies established that Alr1p is localised to the plasma membrane. The localisation of the Alr1p was observed to be internalised and degraded in the vacuole in response to extracellular cations. Mg^{2+}, at very low extracellular concentrations (100 μM; < 10% of the standard media Mg^{2+} content), and Co^{2+} and Mn^{2+} at relatively high concentrations (> 20× standard media), induced the change in Alr1p protein localisation, and the effect was dependent on functional ubiquitination, endocytosis and vacuolar degradation. This mechanism was proposed to allow the regulation of Mg^{2+} uptake by yeast. However, a recent report indicates that several of the observations made by Stadler et al. were not reproducible. For example, regulation of ALR1 mRNA accumulation by Mg^{2+} supply was not observed, and the stability of the Alr1 protein was not reduced by exposure to excess Mg^{2+}. The original observation of Mg-dependent accumulation of the Alr1 protein under steady-state low-Mg conditions was replicated, but this effect was shown to be an artifact caused by the addition of a small peptide (epitope) to the protein to allow its detection. Despite these problems, Alr1 activity was demonstrated to respond to Mg supply, suggesting that the activity of the protein is regulated directly, as was observed for some bacterial CorA proteins.

A functional Alr1p (wild type) or Alr2p (overexpressed) is required for S. cerevisiae growth in standard conditions (4 mM Mg^{2+}), and Alr1p can support normal growth at Mg^{2+} concentrations as low as 30 μM. ^{57}Co^{2+} is taken up into yeast via the Alr1p protein with a km of 77 – 105 μM (; C. MacDiarmid and R. C. Gardner, unpublished data), but the Ki for Mg^{2+} inhibition of this transport is currently unknown. The transport of other cations by the Alr1p protein was assayed by the inhibition of yeast growth. The overexpression of Alr1p led to increased sensitivity to Ca^{2+}, Co^{2+}, Cu^{2+}, La^{3+}, Mn^{2+}, Ni^{2+} and Zn^{2+}, an array of cations similar to those shown to be transported into yeast by a CorA-like transport system. The increased toxicity of the cations in the presence of the transporter is assumed to be due to the increased accumulation of the cation inside the cell.

The evidence that Alr1p is primarily a Mg^{2+} transporter is that the loss of Alr1p leads to a decreased total cell content of Mg^{2+}, but not of other cations. Additionally, two electrophysiological studies where Alr1p was produced in yeast or Xenopus oocytes showed a Mg^{2+}-dependent current in the presence of the protein; Salih et al., in prep.

The kinetics of Mg^{2+} uptake by Alr1p have been investigated by electrophysiology techniques on whole yeast cells. The results suggested that Alr1p is very likely to act as an ion-selective channel. In the same paper, the authors reported that Mg^{2+} transport by Alr1p varied from 200 pA to 1500 pA, with a mean current of 264 pA. No quantification of the amount of protein producing the current was presented, so the results lack comparability with the bacterial Mg^{2+} transport proteins.

The alternative techniques of ^{28}Mg^{2+} radiotracer analysis and mag-fura 2 to measure Mg^{2+} uptake have not yet been used with Alr1p. ^{28}Mg^{2+} is currently not available and the mag-fura 2 system is unlikely to provide simple uptake data in yeast. The yeast cell maintains a heterogeneous distribution of Mg^{2+} suggesting that multiple systems inside the yeast are transporting Mg^{2+} into storage compartments. This internal transport will very likely mask the uptake process. The expression of ALR1 in S. typhimurium without Mg^{2+} uptake genes may be an alternative, but, as stated earlier, the effects of a heterologous expression system would need to be taken into account.

=== MNR2 ===
The MNR2 gene encodes a protein closely related to the Alr proteins, but includes conserved features that define a distinct subgroup of CorA proteins in fungal genomes, suggesting a distinct role in Mg^{2+} homeostasis. Like an alr1 mutant, growth of an mnr2 mutant was sensitive to Mg^{2+}-deficient conditions, but the mnr2 mutant was observed to accumulate more Mg^{2+} than a wild-type strain under these conditions. These phenotypes suggested that Mnr2 may regulate Mg^{2+} storage within an intracellular compartment. Consistent with this interpretation, the Mnr2 protein was localized to the membrane of the vacuole, an internal compartment implicated in the storage of excess mineral nutrients by yeast. A direct role of Mnr2 in Mg^{2+} transport was suggested by the observation that increased Mnr2 expression, which redirected some Mnr2 protein to the cell surface, also suppressed the Mg^{2+}-requirement of an alr1 alr2 double mutant strain. The mnr2 mutation also altered accumulation of other divalent cations, suggesting this mutation may increase Alr gene expression or protein activity. Recent work supported this model, by showing that Alr1 activity was increased in an mnr2 mutant strain, and that the mutation was associated with induction of Alr1 activity at a higher external Mg concentration than was observed for an Mnr2 wild-type strain. These effects were observed without any change in Alr1 protein accumulation, again indicating that Alr1 activity may be regulated directly by the Mg concentration within the cell.

=== MRS2 and Lpe10 ===
Like the ALR genes, the MRS2 gene was cloned and sequenced before it was identified as a Mg^{2+} transporter. The MRS2 gene was identified in the nuclear genome of yeast in a screen for suppressors of a mitochondrial gene RNA splicing mutation, and was cloned and sequenced by Wiesenberger et al. (1992). Mrs2p was not identified as a putative Mg^{2+} transporter until Bui et al. (1999). Gregan et al. (2001a) identified LPE10 by homology to MRS2 and showed that both LPE10 and MRS2 mutants altered the Mg^{2+} content of yeast mitochondria and affected RNA splicing activity in the organelle. Mg^{2+} transport has been shown to be directly mediated by Mrs2p, but not for Lpe10p.

The Mrs2p and Lpe10p proteins are 470 and 413 amino acid residues in size, respectively, and a 250–300 amino acid region in the middle of the proteins shows a weak similarity to the full CorA protein. The TM topologies of the Mrs2p and Lpe10p proteins have been assessed using a protease protection assay and are shown in the figure. TM 1 and 2 correspond to TM 2 and 3 in the CorA protein. The conserved GMN motif is at the outside end of the first TM domain, and when the glycine (G) in this motif was mutated to a cysteine (C) in Mrs2p, Mg^{2+} transport was strongly reduced.

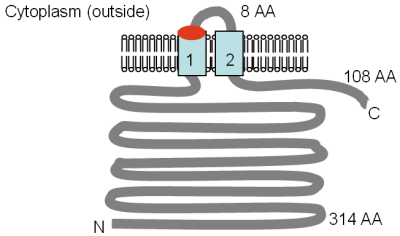
The TM topology of the MRS2 and LPE10 proteins

The figure shows the experimentally determined topology of Mrs2p and Lpe10p as adapted from Bui et al. (1999) and Gregan et al. (2001a). The GMN motif location is indicated in red and the TM domains in light blue. The orientation in the membrane and the positions of the N- and C-termini are indicated. The various sizes of the soluble domains are given in amino acids (AA), TM domains are numbered, and the figure is not drawn to scale.

Mrs2p has been localised to the mitochondrial inner membrane by subcellular fractionation and immunodetection and Lpe10p to the mitochondria. Mitochondria lacking Mrs2p do not show a fast Mg^{2+} uptake, only a slow 'leak', and overaccumulation of Mrs2p leads to an increase in the initial rate of uptake. Additionally, CorA, when fused to the mitochondrial leader sequence of Mrs2p, can partially complement the mitochondrial defect conferred by the loss of either Mrs2p or Lpe10p. Hence, Mrs2p and/or Lpe10p may be the major Mg^{2+} uptake system for mitochondria. A possibility is that the proteins form heterodimers, as neither protein (when overexpressed) can fully complement the loss of the other.

The characteristics of Mg^{2+} uptake in isolated mitochondria by Mrs2p were quantified using mag-fura 2. The uptake of Mg^{2+} by Mrs2p shared a number of attributes with CorA. First, Mg^{2+} uptake was directly dependent on the electric potential (ΔΨ) across the boundary membrane. Second, the uptake is saturated far below that which the ΔΨ theoretically permits, so the transport of Mg^{2+} by Mrs2p is likely to be regulated in a similar manner to CorA, possibly by the inactivation of the protein. Third, Mg^{2+} efflux was observed via Mrs2p upon the artificial depolarisation of the mitochondrial membrane by valinomycin. Finally, the Mg^{2+} fluxes through Mrs2p are inhibited by cobalt (III) hexaammine.

The kinetics of Mg^{2+} uptake by Mrs2p were determined in the Froschauer et al. (2004) paper on CorA in bacteria. The initial change in free Mg^{2+} concentration was 150 μM s-1 for wild type and 750 μM s-1 for mitochondria from yeast overexpressing MRS2. No attempt was made to scale the observed transport to the amount of transporter present.

== Protozoan (Paramecium) ==
The transport of Mg^{2+} into Paramecium has been characterised largely by R. R. Preston and his coworkers. Electrophysiological techniques on whole Paramecium were used to identify and characterise Mg^{2+} currents in a series of papers before the gene was cloned by Haynes et al. (2002).

The open reading frame for the XNTA gene is 1707 bp in size, contains two introns and produces a predicted protein of 550 amino acids. The protein has been predicted to contain 11 TM domains and also contains the α1 and α2 motifs (see figure) of the SLC8 (Na+/Ca^{2+} exchanger) and SLC24 (K+ dependent Na+/Ca^{2+} exchanger) human solute transport proteins. The XntAp is equally similar to the SLC8 and SLC24 protein families by amino acid sequence, but the predicted TM topology is more like that of SLC24, but the similarity is at best weak and the relationship is very distant. The AtMHX protein from plants also shares a distant relationship with the SLC8 proteins.

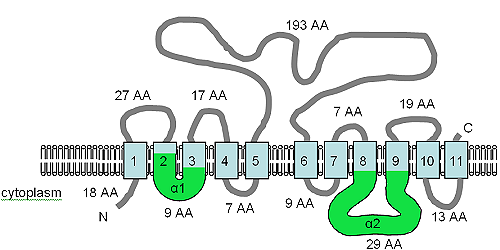
The TM topology of the XNTA protein

The figure shows the predicted TM topology of XntAp. Adapted from Haynes et al. (2002), this figure shows the computer predicted membrane topology of XntAp in Paramecium. The orientation in the membrane was determined using HMMTOP. The TM domains are shown in light blue, the α1 and α2 domains are shown in green. The orientation in the membrane and the positions of the N- and C-termini are indicated and the figure is not drawn to scale.

The Mg^{2+}-dependent currents carried by XntAp are kinetically like that of a channel protein and have an ion selectivity order of Mg^{2+} > Co^{2+}, Mn^{2+} > Ca^{2+} — a series again very similar to that of CorA. Unlike the other transport proteins reported so far, XntAp is dependent on intracellular Ca^{2+}. The transport is also dependent on ΔΨ, but again Mg^{2+} is not transported to equilibrium, being limited to approximately 0.4 mM free Mg^{2+} in the cytoplasm. The existence of an intracellular compartment with a much higher free concentration of Mg^{2+} (8 mM) was supported by the results.

== Animals ==
The investigation of Mg^{2+} in animals, including humans, has lagged behind that in bacteria and yeast. This is largely because of the complexity of the systems involved, but also because of the impression within the field that Mg^{2+} was maintained at high levels in all cells and was unchanged by external influences. Only in the last 25 years has a series of reports begun to challenge this view, with new methodologies finding that free Mg^{2+} content is maintained at levels where changes might influence cellular metabolism.

=== MRS2 ===
A bioinformatic search of the sequence databases identified one homologue of the MRS2 gene of yeast in a range of metazoans. The protein has a very similar sequence and predicted TM topology to the yeast protein, and the GMN motif is intact at the end of the first TM domain. The human protein, hsaMrs2p, has been localised to the mitochondrial membrane in mouse cells using a GFP fusion protein.

Very little is known about the Mg^{2+} transport characteristics of the protein in mammals, but Zsurka et al. (2001) has shown that the human Mrs2p complements the mrs2 mutants in the yeast mitochondrial Mg^{2+} uptake system.

=== SLC41 (MgtE) ===
The identification of this gene family in the metazoa began with a signal sequence trap method for isolating secreted and membrane proteins. Much of the identification has come from bioinformatic analyses. Three genes were eventually identified in humans, another three in mouse and three in Caenorhabditis elegans, with a single gene in Anopheles gambiae. The pFAM database lists the MgtE domain as pFAM01769 and additionally identifies a MgtE domain-containing protein in Drosophila melanogaster. The proteins containing the MgtE domain can be divided into seven classes, as defined by pFAM using the type and organisation of the identifiable domains in each protein. Metazoan proteins are present in three of the seven groups. All of the metazoa proteins contain two MgtE domains, but some of these have been predicted only by context recognition (Coin, Bateman and Durbin, unpublished. See the pFAM website for further details).

The human SLC41A1 protein contains two MgtE domains with 52% and 46% respective similarity to the PF01769 consensus sequence and is predicted to contain ten TM domains, five in each MgtE domain (see figure), which suggests that the MgtE protein of bacteria may work as a dimer.

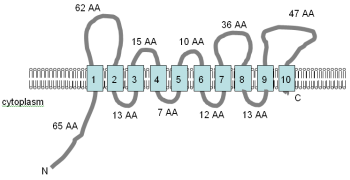
The predicted TM topology of MgtE from H. sapiens

Adapted from Wabakken et al. (2003) and the pFAM database, the figure shows the computer predicted membrane topology of MgtE in H. sapiens. The TM domains are shown in light blue, the orientation in the membrane and the positions of the N- and C-termini are indicated, and the figure is not drawn to scale.

Wabakken et al. (2003) found that the transcript of the SLC41A1 gene was expressed in all human tissues tested, but at varying levels, with the heart and testis having the highest expression of the gene. No explanation of the expression pattern has been suggested with regard to Mg^{2+}-related physiology.

It has not been shown whether the SLC41 proteins transport Mg^{2+} or complement a Mg^{2+} transport mutation in any experimental system. However, it has been suggested that as MgtE proteins have no other known function, they are likely to be Mg^{2+} transporters in the metazoa as they are in the bacteria. This will need to be verified using one of the now standard experiment systems for examining Mg^{2+} transport.

=== TRPM6/ TRPM7 ===
The investigation of the TRPM genes and proteins in human cells is an area of intense recent study and, at times, debate. Montell et al. (2002) have reviewed the research into the TRP genes, and a second review by Montell (2003) has reviewed the research into the TRPM genes.

The TRPM family of ion channels has members throughout the metazoa. The TRPM6 and TRPM7 proteins are highly unusual, containing both an ion channel domain and a kinase domain (Figure 1.7), the role of which brings about the most heated debate.

The activity of these two proteins has been very difficult to quantify. TRPM7 by itself appears to be a Ca^{2+} channel but in the presence of TRPM6 the affinity series of transported cations places Mg^{2+} above Ca^{2+}. The differences in reported conductance were caused by the expression patterns of these genes. TRPM7 is expressed in all cell types tested so far, while TRPM6 shows a more restricted pattern of expression. An unfortunate choice of experimental system by Voets et al., (2004) led to the conclusion that TRPM6 is a functional Mg^{2+} transporter. However, later work by Chubanov et al. (2004) clearly showed that TRPM7 is required for TRPM6 activity and that the results of Voets et al. are explained by the expression of TRPM7 in the experimental cell line used by Voets et al. in their experiments. Whether TRPM6 is functional by itself is yet to be determined.

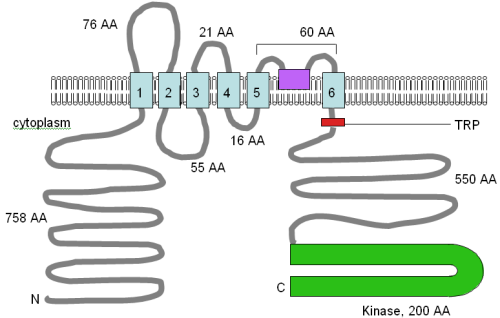
The predicted TM topology of the TRPM6 and TRPM7 proteins

The predicted TM topology of the TPRM6 and TRPM7 proteins has been adapted from Nadler et al. (2001), Runnels et al. (2001) and Montell et al. (2002), this figure shows the computer predicted membrane topology of the TRPM6 and TRPM7 proteins in Homo sapiens. At this time, the topology shown should be considered a tentative hypothesis. The TM domains are shown in light blue, the pore loop in purple, the TRP motif in red and the kinase domain in green. The orientation in the membrane and the positions of the N- and C-termini are indicated and the figure is not drawn to scale.

The conclusions of the Voets et al. (2004) paper are probably incorrect in attributing the Mg^{2+} dependent currents to TRPM7 alone, and their kinetic data are likely to reflect the combined TRPM7/ TRPM6 channel. The report presents a robust collection of data consistent with a channel-like activity passing Mg^{2+}, based on both electrophysiological techniques and also mag-fura 2 to determine changes in cytoplasmic free Mg^{2+}.

=== Paracellular transport ===
Claudins allow for Mg^{2+} transport via the paracellular pathway; that is, it mediates the transport of the ion through the tight junctions between cells that form an epithelial cell layer. In particular, Claudin-16 allows the selective reuptake of Mg^{2+} in the human kidney. Some patients with mutations in the CLDN19 gene also have altered magnesium transport.

The gene Claudin-16 was cloned by Simon et al. (1999), but only after a series of reports described the Mg^{2+} flux itself with no gene or protein. The expression pattern of the gene was determined by RT-PCR, and was shown to be very tightly confined to a continuous region of the kidney tubule running from the medullary thick descending limb to the distal convoluted tubule. This localisation was consistent with the earlier reports for the location of Mg^{2+} re-uptake by the kidney. Following the cloning, mutations in the gene were identified in patients with familial hypomagnesaemia with hypercalciuria and nephrocalcinosis, strengthening the links between the gene and the uptake of Mg^{2+}.

== Plants ==
The current knowledge of the molecular mechanisms for Mg^{2+} transport in plants is very limited, with only three publications reporting a molecular basis for Mg^{2+} transport in plants. However, the importance of Mg^{2+} to plants has been well described, and physiological and ecophysiological studies about the effects of Mg^{2+} are numerous. This section will summarise the knowledge of a gene family identified in plants that is distantly related to CorA. Another gene, a Mg^{2+}/H^{+} exchanger (AtMHX), unrelated to this gene family and to CorA has also been identified, is localised to the vacuolar membrane, and will be described last.

=== The AtMRS2 gene family ===
Schock et al. (2000) identified and named the family AtMRS2 based on the similarity of the genes to the MRS2 gene of yeast. The authors also showed that the AtMRS2-1 gene could complement a Δmrs2 yeast mutant phenotype. Independently, Li et al. (2001) published a report identifying the family and showing that two additional members could complement Mg^{2+} transport deficient mutants, one in S. typhimurium and the other in S. cerevisiae.

The three genes that have been shown to transport Mg^{2+} are AtMRS2-1, AtMRS2-10 and AtMRS2-11, and these genes produce proteins 442, 443 and 459 amino acids in size, respectively. Each of the proteins shows significant similarity to Mrs2p of yeast and a weak similarity to CorA of bacteria, contains the conserved GMN amino acid motif at the outside end of the first TM domain, and is predicted to have two TM domains.

The AtMRS2-1 gene, when expressed in yeast from the MRS2 promoter and being fused C-terminally to the first 95 amino acids of the Mrs2p protein, was directed to the mitochondria, where it complemented a Δmrs2 mutant both phenotypically (mitochondrial RNA splicing was restored) and with respect to the Mg^{2+} content of the organelle. No data on the kinetics of the transport was presented. The AtMRS2-11 gene was analysed in yeast (in the alr1 alr2 strain), where it was shown that expression of the gene significantly increased the rate of Mg^{2+} uptake into starved cells over the control, as measured using flame atomic absorption spectroscopy of total cellular Mg^{2+} content. However, Alr1p was shown to be significantly more effective at transporting Mg^{2+} at low extracellular concentrations, suggesting that the affinity of AtMRS2-11 for Mg^{2+} is lower than that of Alr1p. An electrophysiological (voltage clamp) analysis of the AtMRS2-11 protein in Xenopus oocytes also showed a Mg^{2+}-dependent current at membrane potentials (ΔΨ) of –100 – –150 mV inside. These values are physiologically significant, as several membranes in plants maintain ΔΨ in this range. However, the author had difficulty reproducing these results due to an apparent "death" of oocytes containing the AtMRS2-11 protein, and therefore these results should be viewed with caution.

The AtMRS2-10 transporter has been analysed using radioactive tracer uptake analysis. 63Ni^{2+} was used as the substitute ion and Mg^{2+} was shown to inhibit the uptake of 63Ni^{2+} with a Ki of 20 μM. Uptake was also inhibited by Co(III)Hex and by other divalent cations. Only Co^{2+} and Cu^{2+} inhibited transport with Ki values less than 1 mM.

The AtMRS2-10 protein was fused to GFP, and was shown to be localised to the plasma membrane. A similar experiment was attempted in the Schock et al. (2000) paper, but the observed localisation was not significantly different from that seen with unfused GFP. The most likely reason for the lack of a definitive localisation of AtMRS2-1 in the Schock et al. paper is that the authors removed the TM domains from the protein, thereby precluding its insertion into a membrane.

The exact physiological significance of the AtMRS2-1 and AtMRS2-10 proteins in plants has yet to be clarified. The AtMRS2-11 gene has been overexpressed (from the CaMV 35S promoter) in A. thaliana. The transgenic line has been shown to accumulate high levels of the AtMRS2-11 transcript. A strong Mg^{2+} deficiency phenotype (necrotic spots on the leaves, see Chapter 1.5 below) was recorded during the screening process (in both the T1 and T2 generations) for a homozygote line, but this phenotype was lost in the T3 generation and could not be reproduced when the earlier generations were screened a second time. The author suggested that environmental effects were the most likely cause of the inconsistent phenotype.

=== AtMHX ===
The first magnesium transporter isolated in any multicellular organism, AtMHX shows no similarity to any previously isolated Mg^{2+} transport protein. The gene was initially identified in the A. thaliana genomic DNA sequence database, by its similarity to the SLC8 family of Na+/Ca^{2+} exchanger genes in humans.

The cDNA sequence of 1990 bp is predicted to produce a 539-amino acid protein. AtMHX is quite closely related to the SLC8 family at the amino acid level and shares a topology with eleven predicted TM domains (Figure A10.5). There is one major difference in the sequence, in that the long non-membranal loop (see Figure A10.5) is 148 amino acids in the AtMHX protein but 500 amino acids in the SLC8 proteins. However, this loop is not well conserved and is not required for transport function in the SLC8 family.

The AtMHX gene is expressed throughout the plant but most strongly in the vascular tissue. The authors suggest that the physiological role of the protein is to store Mg^{2+} in these tissues for later release when needed. The protein localisation to the vacuolar membrane supports this suggestion (see also Chapter 1.5).

The protein transports Mg^{2+} into the vacuolar space and H^{+} out, as demonstrated by electrophysiological techniques. The transport is driven by the ΔpH maintained between the vacuolar space (pH 4.5 – 5.9) and the cytoplasm (pH 7.3 – 7.6) by an H^{+}-ATPase. How the transport of Mg^{2+} by the protein is regulated was not determined. Currents were observed to pass through the protein in both directions, but the Mg^{2+} out current required a 'cytoplasmic' pH of 5.5, a condition not found in plant cells under normal circumstances. In addition to the transport of Mg^{2+}, Shaul et al. (1999) also showed that the protein could transport Zn^{2+} and Fe^{2+}, but did not report on the capacity of the protein to transport other divalent cations (e.g. Co^{2+} and Ni^{2+}) or its susceptibility to inhibition by cobalt (III) hexaammine.

The detailed kinetics of Mg^{2+} transport have not been determined for AtMHX. However, physiological effects have been demonstrated. When A. thaliana plants were transformed with overexpression constructs of the AtMHX gene driven by the CaMV 35S promoter, the plants over-accumulated the protein and showed a phenotype of necrotic lesions in the leaves, which the authors suggest is caused by a disruption in the normal function of the vacuole, given their observation that the total Mg^{2+} (or Zn^{2+}) content of the plants was not altered in the transgenic plants.

The predicted TM topology of the AtMHX protein

The image has been adapted from Shaul et al. (1999) and Quednau et al. (2004), and combined with an analysis using HMMTOP, this figure shows the computer predicted membrane topology of the AtMHX protein in Arabidopsis thaliana. At this time the topology shown should be considered a tentative hypothesis. The TM domains are shown in light blue, the orientation in the membrane and the positions of the N- and C-termini are indicated, and the figure is not drawn to scale. The α1 and α2 domains, shown in green, are both quite hydrophobic and may both be inserted into the membrane.
