= Rho utilisation site =

Rho utilisation site, also known by the acronym rut, is a sequence of RNA in bacteria upstream of the terminator region which serves as a binding site for the protein known as rho factor. This sequence is necessary in rho-dependent termination of DNA transcription in bacteria. The common feature of the rut site is an abundance of cytosine and paucity of guanine residues, although these sequences vary widely in different genes with little homology.

A few algorithms have been developed to predict such sites.
