= Rho factor =

Prokaryotic protein

Transcription termination factor Rho
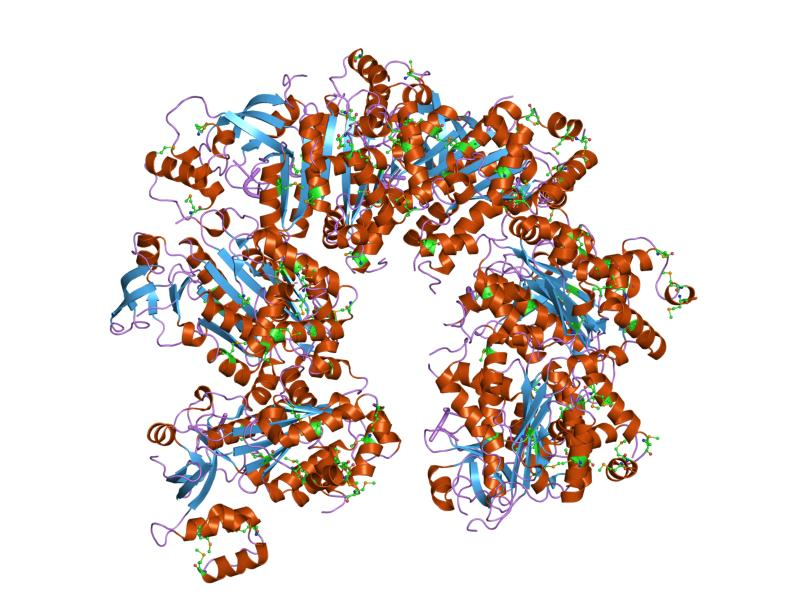
- Rho factor homohexamer

Identifiers
- Organism: E. coli
- Symbol: rho
- UniProt: P0AG30
Search for
- Structures: Swiss-model
- Domains: InterPro

Transcription termination factor Rho

Identifiers
- Symbol: Term_rho
- InterPro: IPR004665

A ρ factor (Rho factor) is a bacterial protein involved in the termination of transcription. Rho factor binds to the transcription terminator pause site, an exposed region of single stranded RNA (a stretch of 72 nucleotides) after the open reading frame at C-rich/G-poor sequences that lack obvious secondary structure.

Rho factor is an essential transcription protein in bacteria. In Escherichia coli, it is a ~274.6 kD hexamer of identical subunits. Each subunit has an RNA-binding domain and an ATP-hydrolysis domain. Rho is a member of the RecA/SF5 family of ATP-dependent hexameric helicases that function by wrapping nucleic acids around a single cleft extending around the entire hexamer. Rho functions as an ancillary factor for RNA polymerase.

There are two types of transcriptional termination in bacteria, rho-dependent termination and intrinsic termination (also called Rho-independent termination). Rho-dependent terminators account for about half of the E. coli factor-dependent terminators. Other termination factors discovered in E. coli include Tau/Ter/Tus and nusA. Rho-dependent terminators were first discovered in bacteriophage genomes.

== Function ==
A Rho factor acts on an RNA substrate. Rho's key function is its helicase activity, for which energy is provided by an RNA-dependent ATP hydrolysis. The initial binding site for Rho is an extended (~70 nucleotides, sometimes 80–100 nucleotides) single-stranded region, rich in cytosine and poor in guanine, called the rho utilisation site (rut), in the RNA being synthesised, upstream of the actual terminator sequence. Several rho binding sequences have been discovered. No consensus is found among these, but the different sequences each seem specific, as small mutations in the sequence disrupts its function. Rho binds to RNA and then uses its ATPase activity to provide the energy to translocate along the RNA until it reaches the RNA–DNA helical region, where it unwinds the hybrid duplex structure. RNA polymerase pauses at the termination sequence, which is because there is a specific site around 100 nt away from the Rho binding site called the Rho-sensitive pause site. So, even though the RNA polymerase is about 40 nt per second faster than Rho, it does not pose a problem for the Rho termination mechanism as the RNA polymerase allows Rho factor to catch up.

In short, Rho factor acts as an ATP-dependent unwinding enzyme, moving along the newly forming RNA molecule towards its 3′ end and unwinding it from the DNA template as it proceeds.

== Mutations ==
A nonsense mutation in one gene of an operon prevents the translation of subsequent genes in the unit. This effect is called mutational polarity. A common cause is the absence of the mRNA corresponding to the subsequent (distal) parts of the unit. Suppose that there are Rho-dependent terminators within the transcription unit, that is, before the terminator that usually is used. Normally these earlier terminators are not used, because the ribosome prevents Rho from reaching RNA polymerase. But a nonsense mutation releases the ribosome, so that Rho is free to attach to and/or move along the RNA, enabling it to act on RNA polymerase at the terminator. As a result, the enzyme is released, and the distal regions of the transcription unit are never transcribed.

== Evolution ==
Rho factor has not been found in Archaea.

== See also ==
- Termination factor
- Mutation Frequency Decline (Mfd) protein is also capable of dissociating RNA polymerase from the DNA template
