= Transcription termination factor, RNA polymerase I =

Protein-coding gene in the species Homo sapiens

TTF1

Identifiers
- Aliases: TTF1, TTF-1, TTF-I, Transcription termination factor, RNA polymerase I, transcription termination factor 1
- External IDs: OMIM: 600777; MGI: 105044; GeneCards: TTF1

Gene location (Human)
Chr.	Chromosome 9 (human)
Band	9q34.13	Start	132,375,548 bp
Band	9q34.13	End	132,406,851 bp

Gene location (Mouse)
Chr.	Chromosome 2 (mouse)
Band	2|2 A3	Start	28,950,274 bp
Band	2|2 A3	End	28,977,668 bp
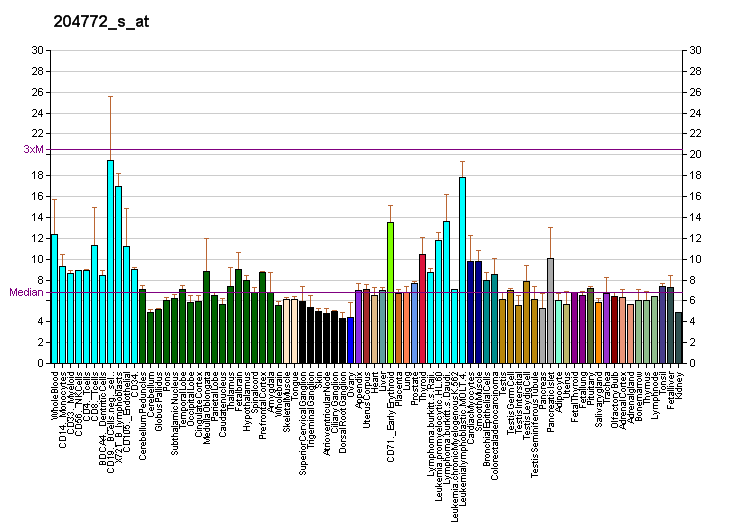

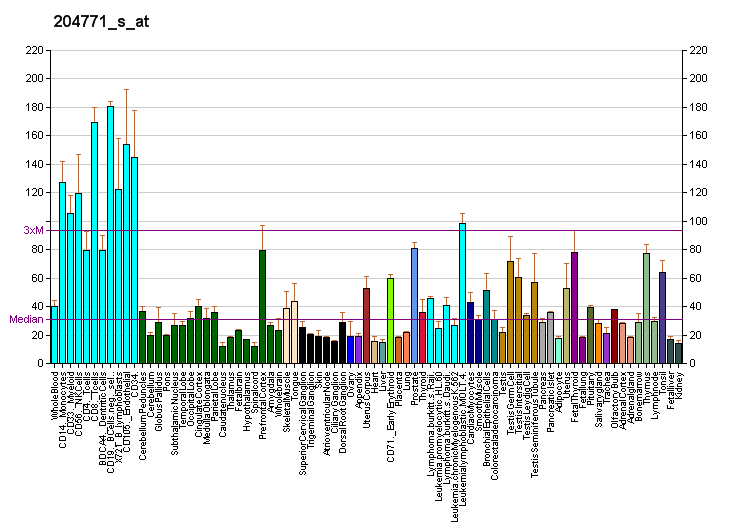
RNA expression pattern
Bgee	Human / Mouse (ortholog); Top expressed in: buccal mucosa cell; trabecular bone; oocyte; secondary oocyte; pylorus; pericardium; cardia; nipple; superior surface of tongue; vena cava / Top expressed in: gastrula; neural layer of retina; submandibular gland; spermatocyte; granulocyte; Paneth cell; thymus; ventricular zone; morula; morula; More reference expression data
BioGPS	More reference expression data
Gene ontology
Molecular function	DNA binding; DNA-binding transcription factor activity, RNA polymerase II-specific; sequence-specific DNA binding; chromatin binding
Cellular component	plasma membrane; nucleolus; nucleoplasm; cytosol; nucleus
Biological process	DNA-templated transcription, termination; negative regulation of DNA replication; regulation of transcription, DNA-templated; transcription, DNA-templated; regulation of transcription by RNA polymerase II; cell differentiation; termination of RNA polymerase I transcription
Sources:Amigo / QuickGO
Orthologs
Databases	NCBI: entry; OMA: entry
Species	Human	Mouse
Entrez	7270	22130
Ensembl	ENSG00000125482	ENSMUSG00000026803
UniProt	Q15361	Q62187
RefSeq (mRNA)	NM_001205296; NM_007344	NM_009442
RefSeq (protein)	NP_001192225; NP_031370	NP_033468
Location (UCSC)	Chr 9: 132.38 – 132.41 Mb	Chr 2: 28.95 – 28.98 Mb
PubMed search
- Wikidata
View/Edit Human	View/Edit Mouse

Transcription termination factor 1 is a protein that in humans is encoded by the TTF1 gene.
