= Intrinsic termination =

Mechanism of termination of RNA transcription

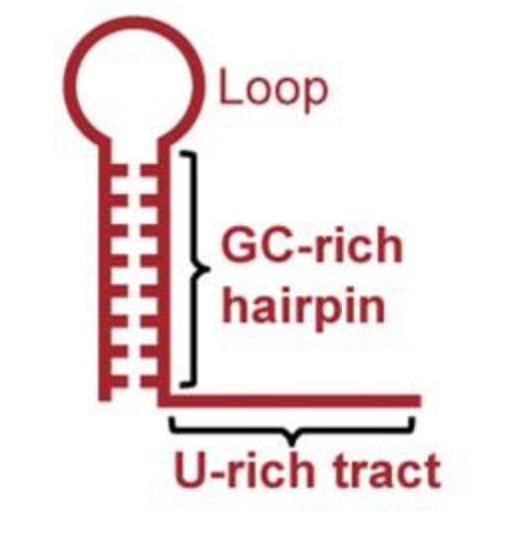
The structure of the RNA stem-loop that facilitates intrinsic termination

Intrinsic or rho-independent termination is one of several natural mechanisms by which the process of transcription is terminated, causing the transcription complex to dissociate and the newly synthesized RNA molecule to be released from the DNA template. In bacteria such as E. coli, transcription is terminated either by a Rho-dependent or Rho-independent process. In the Rho-dependent process, the Rho protein locates and binds a signal sequence in the nascent RNA transcript and signals for cleavage. Contrarily, intrinsic termination does not require a special protein to signal termination but is instead facilitated by secondary structures formed by nucleotide sequences encoded within the nascent RNA itself.

When the termination process begins, the nascent transcript forms a stable secondary structure known as a hairpin loop or a stem-loop. This RNA hairpin is followed immediately downstream by multiple uracil nucleotides. The hydrogen bonds between uracil (rU) and adenine (dA) are very weak. A protein bound to RNA polymerase (nusA) binds to the stem-loop structure tightly enough to cause the polymerase to temporarily stall. This pausing of the polymerase coincides with transcription of the poly-uracil sequence. The weak adenine-uracil bonds lower the energy of destabilization for the RNA-DNA duplex, thereby allowing it to unwind and dissociate from the RNA polymerase. Overall, the modified RNA structure is what terminates transcription. Stem-loop structures that are not followed by a poly-uracil sequence cause the RNA polymerase to pause briefly, though it typically continues transcription afterward because the duplex is too stable to unwind far enough to cause termination.

Rho-independent transcription termination is a frequent mechanism underlying the activity of cis-acting RNA regulatory elements such as riboswitches.

== Function ==
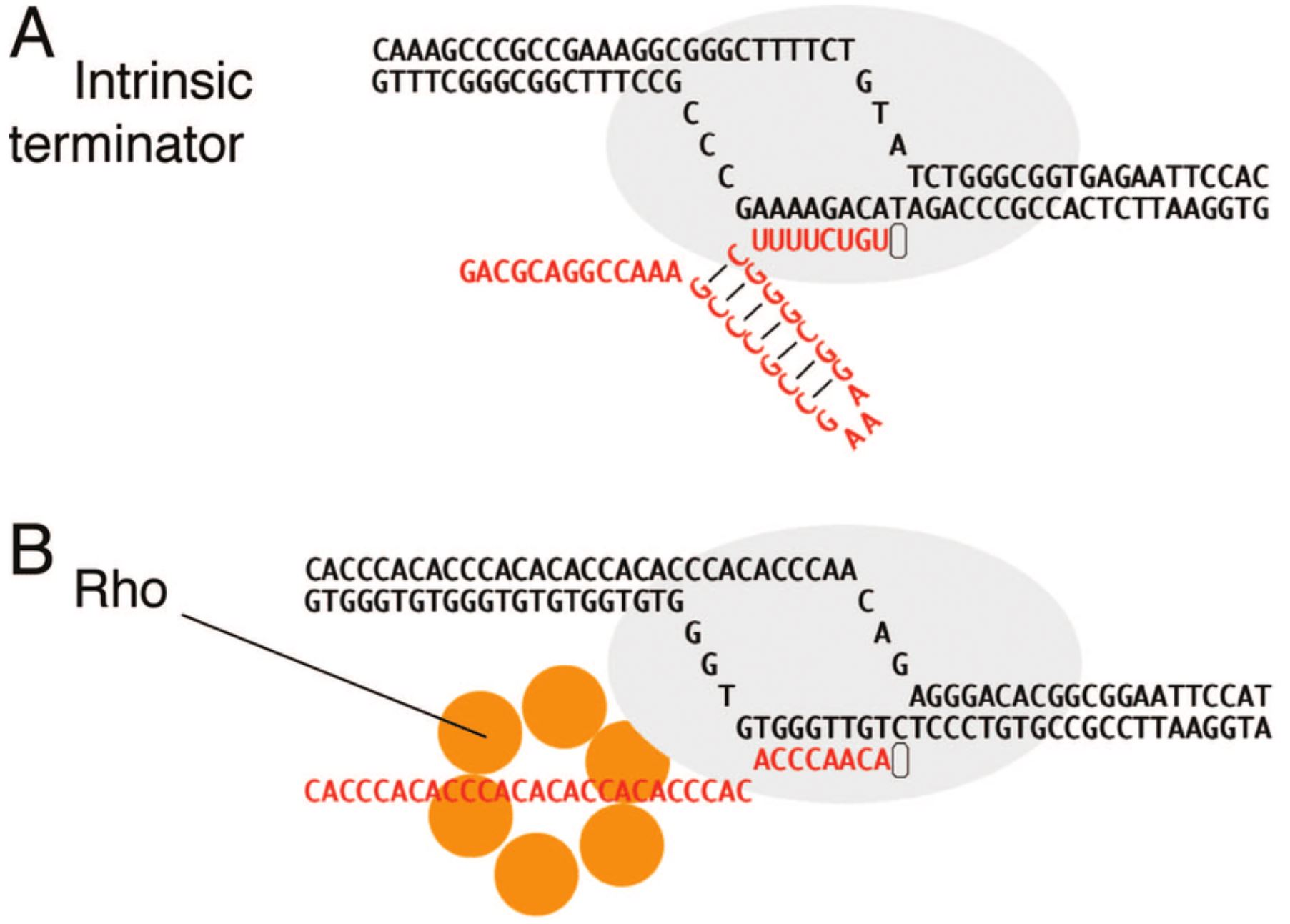
Comparison of rho-dependent termination vs. intrinsic termination

The function of intrinsic termination is to signal for the dissociation of the ternary elongation complex (TEC), which ends transcription and releases RNA polymerase and its associated cofactors as well as the new RNA transcript. Intrinsic termination occurs independently of the protein Rho, in contrast to Rho-dependent termination, where the Rho protein must act on the RNA polymerase in order for it to dissociate from the transcription complex. Here, there is no extra protein and the transcript forms its own loop structure. Intrinsic termination thus regulates the level of transcription as well, determining how many polymerases can transcribe a gene over a given period of time, and can help prevent interactions with neighboring chromosomes.

=== Regulation ===
The process itself is regulated through both positive and negative termination factors, usually through modification of the hairpin structure. This is accomplished through interactions with segments of the single-stranded RNA transcript that correspond to the upstream area of the loop, resulting in disruption of the termination process. Furthermore, there is some implication that the nut site may also contribute to regulation, as it is involved in recruitment of some critical components in the formation of the hairpin.

== Structure ==
In intrinsic termination, self-complementary sequences within the RNA transcript cause it to double back and form base pairs with itself, creating an RNA stem-loop or hairpin structure. This structure is critical for the release of both the transcript and polymerase at the end of transcription. In living cells, the key components are the stable stem-loop itself, as well as the sequence of 6–8 uracil residues that follow it. The stem usually consists of 8–9 mostly guanine and cytosine (G–C) base pairs, and the loop consists of 4–8 residues. It is thought that the stem portion of the structure is essential for transcription termination, while the loop is not. This is suggested by the fact that termination can be achieved in non-native structures that do not include the loop.

The stem portion of the hairpin is usually rich in G–C base pairs. G–C base pairs have significant base-stacking interactions, and can form three hydrogen bonds with each other, which makes them very thermodynamically favorable. Conversely, while the uracil-rich sequence that follows the hairpin is not always necessary for termination, it is hypothesized that the uracil-rich sequence aids in intrinsic termination because the U–A bond is not as strong as G–C bonds. This inherent instability acts to kinetically favor the dissociation of the RNA transcript.

=== Experiments to determine structurally significant features ===
To determine the optimal length of the stem, researchers modified its length and observed how quickly termination occurred. When the length of the stem was lengthened or shortened from the standard length of 8–9 base pairs, termination was less efficient, and if the changes were great enough, termination ceased completely.

Experiments determined that if an oligonucleotide sequence that is identical to the downstream portion of the stem is present, it will base pair with the upstream portion. This creates a structure that is analogous to the native stem-loop structure but is missing the loop at the end. Without the presence of the loop, intrinsic termination is still able to occur. This indicates that the loop is not inherently necessary for intrinsic termination.

Generally, the absence of the uracil-rich sequence following the stem-loop will result in a delay or pause in transcription, but termination will not cease completely.

== Mechanism ==
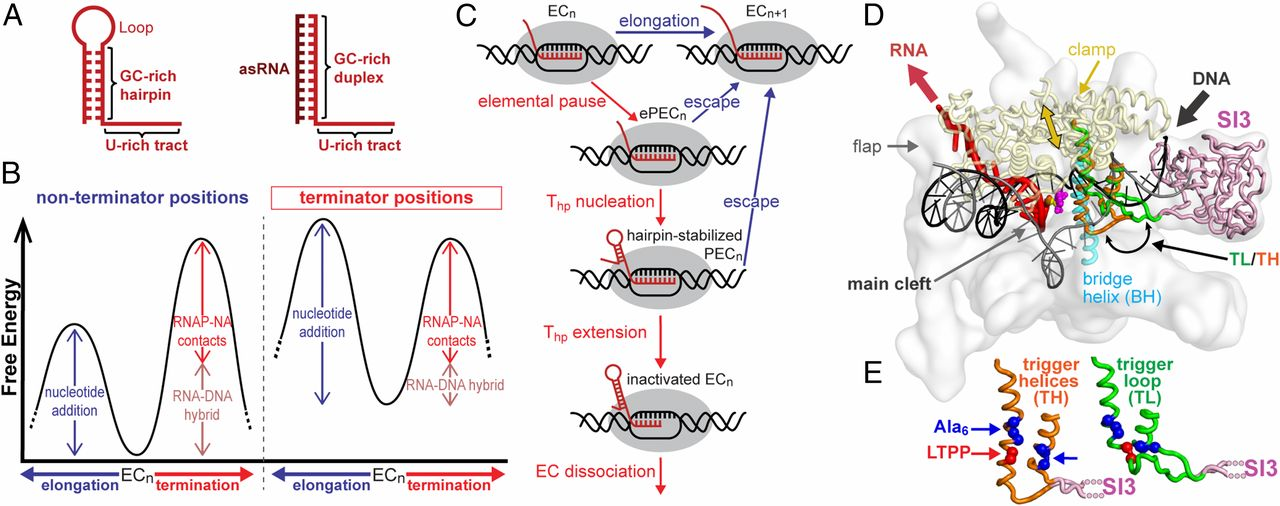
A visual representation behind the mechanism for intrinsic termination

Intrinsic termination is cued by signals directly encoded in the DNA and RNA. Signal appears in as a hairpin and is followed by 8 uridines at the 3'-end. This leads to a rapid dissociation of the elongation complex. Hairpin inactivates and destabilizes the TEC by weakening interactions in the RNA-DNA binding site and other sites that hold this complex together. The pausing induced by the stretch of uracils is important and provides time for hairpin formation. In the absence of the U-tract, hairpin formation does not result in efficient termination, indicating its importance in this process.

The elongation destabilization process occurs in four steps:

1. As RNA polymerase transcribes the final nucleotides of the terminator U-tract, it pauses at the end of the U-tract, favoring the termination pathway in the kinetic competition between elongation and termination.
2. Nucleation of the terminator hairpin (Thp) occurs.
3. The hairpin is completed and the elongation complex is inactivated.
4. The elongation complex dissociates. A complete mechanism is likely to involve specific interactions of the polymerase, the RNA terminator hairpin, and dT-rich template sequences.

== Inhibition ==
In terms of inhibitors of intrinsic termination, much is still unknown. One of the few examples that is known is bacteriophage protein 7. This is made up of 3.4A and 4.0A cryo-EM structures of P7-NusA-TEC and P7-TEC. This bacteriophage protein 7 stops transcription termination by blocking the RNA polymerase (RNAP) RNA-exit channel and impeding RNA-hairpin formation at the intrinsic terminator. Furthermore, bacteriophage protein 7 inhibits RNAP-clamp motions. Shortening the C-terminal half-helix of the RNAP slightly decreases the inhibitory activity. These RNAP clamp motions have been targeted by some other inhibitors of bacterial RNAP. These inhibitors include myxopyronin, corallopyronin, and ripostatin. These work by inhibiting isomerization.

== Beyond bacteria ==
RNA polymerases in all three domains of life have some version of factor-independent termination. All of them use poly-uracil tracts, though the exact mechanisms and accessory sequences vary. In archaea and eukaryotes, there appears to be no requirement of a hairpin.

=== Archaea ===
Archaeal transcription shares eukaryotic and bacterial ties. With eukaryotes, it shares similarities with its initiation factors that help transcription identify appropriate sequences such as TATA box homologs as well as factors that maintain transcription elongation. However, additional transcription factors similar to those found in bacteria are needed for the whole process to occur.

In terms of transcription termination, the archaeal genome is unique in that it is sensitive to both intrinsic termination and factor-dependent termination. Bioinformatic analysis has shown that approximately half of the genes and operons in Archaea arrange themselves into signals or contain signals for intrinsic termination. Archaeal RNA polymerase is responsive to intrinsic signals both in vivo and in vitro such as the poly-U-rich regions. However, unlike bacterial intrinsic termination, no specific RNA structure or hairpin is needed. The surrounding environment and other genome factors can still influence the termination.

Factor-dependent termination in archaea is also distinct from factor-dependent termination in bacteria. The terminational factor aCASP1 (also known as FttA) recognizes poly-U-rich regions, probably cooperating with the "intrinsic" mode to achieve more efficient termination.

=== Eukaryotes ===
RNA polymerase III performs "intrinsic-like" termination. The majority of genes transcribed by RNAP III have a poly(dT) region. However, although poly(dT) pauses every RNA polymerase, it alone cannot be insufficient; some other mechanism must destabilize the clamp. In RNAP III, some poly(dT) sites are indeed occasionally read-through: some genes have multiple such regions, allowing transcripts of different lengths to be produced.

The instability of rU:dA hybrids likely is essential to termination by RNAP III. Parts of core subunits C1 and C2, as well as "subcomplexes" C53/37 and C11 are functionally important. A number of extraneous factors can modify the termination behavior.

== See also ==
- Rho factor
- WebGeSTer
- Trp operon
