= Listeria monocytogenes non-coding RNA =

Listeria snRNA rli22
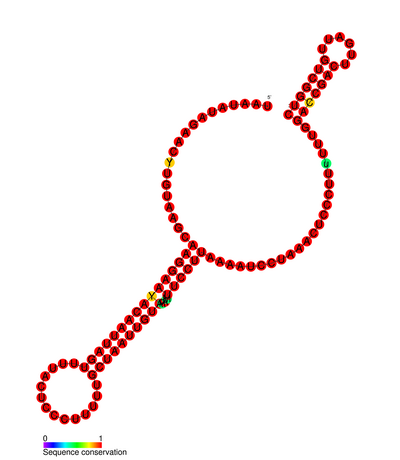
- Predicted secondary structure of Listeria snRNA rli22

Identifiers
- Symbol: rli22
- Rfam: RF01457

Other data
- RNA type: gene, snRNA
- Domain: Listeria
- PDB structures: PDBe

Listeria monocytogenes is a gram positive bacterium and causes many food-borne infections such as Listeriosis. This bacteria is ubiquitous in the environment where it can act as either a saprophyte when free living within the environment or as a pathogen when entering a host organism. Many non-coding RNAs have been identified within the bacteria genome where several of these have been classified as novel non-coding RNAs and may contribute to pathogenesis.

Tiling arrays and mutagenesis identified many non-coding RNAs within the L. monocytogenes genome and the location of these non-coding RNAs within the bacterial genome was confirmed by RACE (rapid amplification of cDNA ends) analysis. These studies showed that the expression of many non-coding RNAs was dependent on the environment and that several of these non-coding RNAs act as cis-regulatory elements. Comparisons between previously characterized non-coding RNAs and those present in the L. monocyotogenes genome identified 50 novel non-coding RNAs in L. monocyotogenes. An additional comparative study between the pathogenic L. monocytogenes strain and the non pathogenic L. innocua strain identified several non-coding RNAs that are only present within L. monocytogenes which suggests that these ncRNAs may have a role in pathogenesis. The tables below summarizes the location, flanking genes and also the characteristics of the novel small non-coding RNAs identified and the previously characterized non-coding RNAs present in L. monocytogenes

== Novel Non-coding RNAs ==
ID	Start	Stop	Size	5′ flanking gene	sense of the gene on the genome	^{a}		3′ flanking gene	Characteristic	Rfam
rli22	31997	32107	110	lmo0028	->	->	->	lmo0029	sRNA	
rli23	172171	172268	97	lmo0172	<-	->			sRNA Antisense to lmo0172 transposase Homolog of rli25 and rli35.	
rli24	271029	271186	157	lmo0256	->	->	->	lmo0257	sRNA	
rli25	357618	357516	102	lmo0330	->	<-			sRNA Antisense to lmo0330: transposase. Homolog of rli23 and rli35	
rli26	388707	388520	187	lmo0360	->	<-	<-	lmo0361	sRNA	
rli27	434831	434929	98	lmo0411	<-	->	<-	lmo0412	sRNA	
rli28	507394	507206	188	lmo0470	->	<-	->	lmo0471	sRNA Homolog of rli50	
rli29	507643	507450	193	lmo0470	->	<-	->	lmo0471	sRNA Antisense to the 5'UTR of lmo0471	
rli30	540785	540670	115	lmo0506	->	<-			sRNA Antisense to lmo0506	
rli31	597812	597926	114	lmo0558	<-	->	->	lmo0559	Required for lysozyme resistance and pathogenesis. Structure characterized as two long hairpins. Interacts with the RNA binding global regulator SpoVG.	
rli32	600750	600604	147	lmo0560	<-	<-	<-	lmo0561	sRNA	
rli33	708326	708860	534	lmo0671	->	->	->	lmo0672	sRNA	
rli34	803031	802948	83	lmo0777	->	<-	->	lmo0778	sRNA	
rli35	855495	855393	102	lmo0828	->	<-			sRNA Antisense to lmo0828: transposase. Homolog of rli23 and rli25	
rli36	859527	859444	83	nifJ	->	<-	<-	fbp	sRNA	
rli37	907576	907832	256	lmo0866	->	->	->	lmo0867	ORF ORF of 58aa. RBS region: TGATACGGGAGTGTGGTGCTAGTTATG	
rli38	1152549	1152917	369	lmo1115	<-	->	->	lmo1116	sRNA role in virulence	
rli39	1179807	1179993	187	lmo1149	->	->	<-	lmo1150	sRNA Annotated as a cobalamin riboswitch in Rfam	
rli40	1275810	1275547	264	lmo1251	->	<-	<-	lmo1252	ORF ORF of 64 aa. RBS region: AGTGAGGCGTCCTTATG	
rli41	1277207	1276713	495	lmo1252	<-	<-	->	lmo1253	Two ORFs ORF of 45 aa. RBS region: AGAGGAGGTATTTTCTATG ORF of 35 aa. RBS region:AAGGAGGAAAACAAATTG	
rli42	1399617	1399447	171	lmo1374	->	<-	->	lmo1375	sRNA	
rli43	1861630	1861377	253	inlC	<-	<-	<-	rplS	ORF ORF of 35aa. RBS region: AGAGTGAGGTGTAATATG	
rli44	2039087	2039375	289	lmo1964	<-	->	<-	lmo1965	ORF ORF of 28aa. RBS region: GGAAAGGATAACCCATG	
rli45	2154775	2154852	77	lmo2074	->	->	<-	lmo2075	sRNA Antisense to rli46	
rli46	2155058	2154765	294	lmo2074	->	<-	<-	lmo2075	sRNA Antisense to rli45	
rli47	2226024	2226532	508	lmo2141	->	->	<-	lmo2142	sRNA	
rli48	2361423	2361274	149	lmo2271	<-	<-	->	lmo2272	sRNA	
rli49	2660179	2660364	185	lmo2579	->	->	<-	lmo2580	sRNA	
rli50	2783274	2783098	176	lmo2709	->	<-	<-	lmo2710	sRNA Homolog of rli28	
rli51	207589	207709	120	hly	->	->	->	mpl	5′-UTR-derived Increased in intestinal lumen	
rli52	552421	552327	94	lmo0517	<-	<-	<-	lmo0518	5′-UTR-derived Putative riboswitch.	
rli53	955829	956001	172	lmo0918	->	->	->	lmo0919	5′-UTR-derived Putative riboswitch.	
rli54	1078584	1079111	527	lmo1051	<-	->	->	pdhA	5′-UTR-derived Putative riboswitch.	
rli55	1198107	1198389	282	lmo1170	->	->	->	pduQ	5′-UTR-derived Putative riboswitch.	
rli56	1199859	1199958	99	pduQ	->	->	->	lmo1172	5′-UTR-derived Putative riboswitch.	
rli57	?	1216658	?	lmo1190	->	->	->	cbiA	3′-UTR-derived Annotated as a cobalamin riboswitch in Rfam lmo1190-rli57 transcript levelncreasedinintestinal lumen	
rli58	?	1639974	?	rpsD	->	<-	<-	lmo1597		
rli59	1702553	1702373	180	lmo1652	<-	<-	<-	lmo1653	5′-UTR-derived	
rli60	2054124	2054308	184	lmo1982	<-	->	->	ilvD	5′-UTR-derived Putative riboswitch.	
rli61	2275363	2275258	106	lmo2187	<-	<-	<-	lmo2188	5′-UTR-derived Putative riboswitch	
rli62	2364508	2364337	172	lmo2277	<-	<-	<-	lmo2278	5′-UTR-derived Putative riboswitch.	
rli63	2613301	?	?	atpI	<-	<-	<-	lmo2537	5′-UTR-derived Putative riboswitch	
rliA	513584	513807	224	lmo0476	<-	>-	>-	lmo0477	snRNA	
rliB	544357	544716	360	lmo0509	->	->	->	lmo0510	sRNA	
rliC	1154309	1154671	363	lmo1117	->	->	<-	lmo1118	sRNA	
rliD	1359529	1359202	328	rpsO	->	<-	->	pnpA	sRNA antisense	
rliE	1584586	1584808	223	comC	<-	->	<-	folC	sRNA antisense to comC mRNA	
rliF	2106292	2106073	220	nadA	->	<-	<-	lmo2026	snRNA	
rliG	2386992	2386715	278	lmo2302	<-	<-	<-	lmo2303	sRNA	
rliH	1180826	1181254	429	lmo1150	<-	->	->	lmo1151	sRNA antisense	
rliI	2842200	2841962	239	lmo2760	<-	<-	->	lmo2761	sRNA	
sbrA	1399363	1399433	70	lmo1374	->	->	->	lmo1375	sRNA	

^{a}Arrows indicate the sense of the gene on the genome. Bold arrows indicate gene absent from L. innocua.

Listeria monocytogenes EGD-e strain was used in these studies EMBL accession AL591824.1

== Characterised non-coding RNAs ==
ID	Rfam
SAM	RF00162
LhrC	RF00616
TPP	RF00059
glmS	RF00234
PreQ1	RF00522
T-box	RF00230
SsrS	RF00013

ID	Rfam
LhrB	RF00558
FMN	RF00050
ssrA	RF00023
SRP	RF00169
PrfA	RF00038
L10 leader	RF00557
Purine	RF00167

ID	Rfam
lysine	RF00168
yybP-ykoY	RF00080
glycine	RF00504
L21	RF00559
RyrR	RF00515
LhrA	RF00615
L13	RF00555
