= LOOT RNA motif =

LOOT
- Consensus secondary structure and sequence conservation of LOOT RNA

Identifiers
- Symbol: LOOT
- Rfam: RF03000

Other data
- RNA type: Gene; sRNA
- SO: SO:0001263
- PDB structures: PDBe

The Latescibacteria, OD1, OP11, TM7 RNA motif (LOOT RNA motif) is a conserved RNA structure that was discovered by bioinformatics. LOOT motif RNAs are found in multiple bacterial phyla that have only recently been discovered, and are currently not well understood: Latescibacteria, OD1/Parcubacteria, OP11 AND TM7. In some cases, no specific organism has been isolated in the relevant phylum, but the existence of the bacterial phylum is known only through analysis of metagenomic sequences. Curiously, the LOOT motif is not known in any phylum that has been studied for a long time.

LOOT motif RNAs might function as cis-regulatory elements, in view of their positions upstream of protein-coding genes. Indeed, the RNAs are upstream of multiple genes that encode non-homologous proteins. If all examples of the RNA were upstream of homologous genes, there is the possibility that the RNAs were conserved in that position simply by inheritance. The non-homology of the genes downstream of LOOT RNAs makes this scenario less likely.

However, the number of different gene classes found downstream of LOOT RNAs is large in comparison to established cis-regulatory RNAs. This unusual variability in genes raises the possibility that the LOOT RNA motif has a more general function than cis regulation. A previously proposed example for the DUF805 RNA motif of a more general function is that of a Rho-independent transcription terminator, which terminates transcription (biology) of operons and is also used as a mechanism in cis-regulatory RNAs such as riboswitches. Thus a Rho-independent transcription terminator has a more general function than being an individual cis regulator. However, since some known cis-regulatory RNAs, e.g., cyclic di-GMP riboswitches do control a wide variety of genes, it is possibility that LOOT RNAs are involved in a regulatory circuit in which many gene classes can participate.
