= Mesoplasma florum riboswitch =

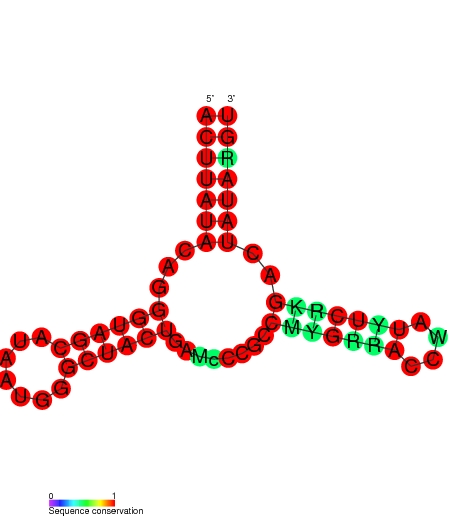
- Predicted secondary structure and sequence conservation of MFR

Identifiers
- Symbol: MFR
- Rfam: RF01510

Other data
- RNA type: Cis-reg; riboswitch
- Domain(s): Bacteria;
- GO: GO:0032546 GO:0031554
- SO: SO:0000035
- PDB structures: PDBe

Riboswitches are cis-acting regulatory elements located within the 5’UTR of mRNA transcripts. These regulatory elements bind small molecules which results in a conformational change within the 5’UTR of the mRNA. The changes in the mRNA secondary structure subsequently result in changes in the expression of the adjacent open reading frame.

Bioinformatic studies have identified several riboswitches present in M. florum. These riboswitches have been mapped to regions located upstream of the guaAB operon and resemble purine riboswitches. The riboswitches identified in M. florum can be classed as novel riboswitches as they deviate in sequence and structure within the loops regions that are required in aptamer binding compared to conventional purine riboswitches. Mutagenesis confirmed that changing nucleotides within the loop regions of this riboswitch altered the specificity for ligand binding. This study showed that the novel riboswitches have a greater diversity in ligands they bind as they were found to bind alternative ligands such as nucleosides. The novel riboswitches were all shown to lie upstream of a putative intrinsic terminator stem and this indicates that these riboswitches control transcription termination. Comparative genomics has shown that these novel riboswitches are exclusive found in M. florum and not present in other strains of bacteria.
