= NhaA-I RNA motif =

nhaA-I
- Consensus secondary structure and sequence conservation of nhaA-I RNA

Identifiers
- Symbol: nhaA-I
- Rfam: RF03057

Other data
- RNA type: Cis-reg; Riboswitch
- SO: SO:0000035
- PDB structures: PDBe

The nhaA-I RNA motif is a conserved RNA structure that was discovered by bioinformatics. nhaA-I motif RNAs are found in Acidobacteriota, alpha-, beta- and Gammaproteobacteria, Verrucomicrobiota and the tentative phylum NC10 (see bacterial phyla and List of taxa with candidatus status).

nhaA-I motif RNAs likely function as cis-regulatory elements, in view of their positions upstream of protein-coding genes. Indeed, it is reasonable to speculate that nhaA-I RNAs directly bind a ligand, and therefore function as riboswitches, in view of their widespread distribution and conserved nucleotide positions. nhaA-I RNAs typically occur upstream of genes that encode exchangers of sodium ions and protons. More rarely, they also exist upstream of genes that encode DUF1646 protein domains, or that are involved in cell signaling or peptidoglycan. DUF1646-coding genes are also regulated by the DUF1646 RNA motif, which also has a potential association with sodium ions. nhaA-I RNAs also sometimes occur in tandem pairs, with two such RNAs nearby to one another. Such arrangements have been proposed to implement cooperative binding to more digitally regulate gene expression, although the biology underlying these tandem arrangements of nhaA-I RNAs is, as of 2018, unknown.
