= Moco =

Moco may refer to:

== Biochemistry ==
- Molybdenum cofactor, any of a number of biochemical cofactors
- MOCOS, molybdenum cofactor sulfurase
- Moco RNA motif, a conserved RNA structure presumed to be a riboswitch that binds molybdenum cofactor
- Moco-II RNA motif, a conserved RNA structure identified by bioinformatics

== Business ==
- Moelis & Company, a global independent investment bank (referred to colloquially as MoCo)
- Mozilla Corporation
- Nissan Moco, marketed name for the Suzuki MR Wagon in Japan
- MocoSpace, a social networking site

== Geography ==
- Montgomery County, Maryland, nicknamed "MoCo"
- Mount Moco, the tallest mountain in Angola

== People ==
- Chilala Moco (born 1977), an Angolan photographer
- Marcolino Moco (born 1953), the Prime Minister of Angola from 1992 to 1996
- Didi Mocó, stage name of Brazilian comedian Renato Aragão (born 1935)
- Miss Moço, Canadian drag queen
- "Moco", stage name of Julian Villarreal from the Mexican band and record producer (Celso Piña) (Banda Machos) (Tigrillos) El Gran Silencio
- Moco, the fictional drug lord in the 1992 film El Mariachi portrayed by Peter Marquardt
- Moco, a character in the anime Dragon Quest

== Zoology ==
- Mocó (Kerodon rupestris), also known as the rock cavy, a Brazilian rodent
- Oligosoma moco, or Moko skink, a species of skink endemic to New Zealand

== See also ==
- Loco moco, a traditional meal in Hawaiian cuisine
