= YkkC-yxkD leader =

Conserved RNA structure in bacteria

ykkC-yxkD leader
- Predicted secondary structure and sequence conservation of ykkC-yxkD

Identifiers
- Symbol: ykkC-yxkD
- Rfam: RF00442

Other data
- RNA type: Cis-reg; riboswitch
- Domain(s): Bacteria
- SO: SO:0000233
- PDB structures: PDBe

The ykkC/yxkD leader is a conserved RNA structure found upstream of the ykkC and yxkD genes in Bacillus subtilis and related genes in other bacteria. The function of this family is unclear for many years although it has been suggested that it may function to switch on efflux pumps and detoxification systems in response to harmful environmental molecules. The Thermoanaerobacter tengcongensis sequence AE013027 overlaps with that of purine riboswitch suggesting that the two riboswitches may work in conjunction to regulate the upstream gene which codes for TTE0584 (Q8RC62), a member of the permease family.

Nelson et al. showed that this riboswitch senses and responds to guanidine and it was renamed Guanidine-I riboswitch. Furthermore, they demonstrated that bacteria are capable of endogenously producing guanidine and the riboswitch controls genes whose products are involved in modification or pumping out guanidine as a toxic compound from bacteria. Crystal structures of the riboswitch bound to the ligand have also been determined.

The mini-ykkC RNA motif is a putative cis-regulatory element that apparently regulates similar genes to those regulated by the Guanidine-I riboswitch (ykkC/yxkD leader). However, the mini-ykkC RNA motif is simpler in structure and has fewer highly conserved nucleotide positions than the ykkC-yxkD leader. Despite this each of its two stem-loop structures directly bind free guanidine. Therefore, mini-ykkC RNA motif represents a distinct class of guanidine-sensing RNAs called Guanidine-II riboswitch. Its crystal structure was also determined.

The ykkC-III RNA motif is a distinct candidate cis-regulatory RNA that appears to regulate genes related to the preceding motifs. Although the structure of ykkC-III RNAs does not resemble ykkC/yxkD RNAs, both have a structure complexity that led to the proposal that they represent riboswitches. The ykkC-III motif has a rigidly conserved ACGA sequence within it that resembles a less rigidly conserved ACGA or ACGG sequence found in mini-ykkC RNAs, but it is unknown whether this observation relates to a biological relationship. Biochemical validation has been presented to show that this motif is a third class of guanidine riboswitches called Guanidine-III riboswitch.

Consensus secondary structure of ykkC-III RNAs. This figure is adapted from a previous publication.
