= RNA motif =

An RNA motif is a description of a group of RNAs that have a related structure. RNA motifs consist of a pattern of features within the primary sequence and secondary structure of related RNAs. Thus, it extends the concept of a sequence motif to include RNA secondary structure. The term "RNA motif" can refer both to the pattern and to the RNA sequences that match it.

== Descriptions of RNAs motifs ==
RNA motifs can be described in two main forms: a multiple sequence alignment or an explicit search pattern. An alignment is usually augmented with a consensus secondary structure, i.e. the structure that is common to all or most RNAs. The sequences in the alignment then implicitly define a pattern of conservation that can, for example, be used to find additional examples of the RNA. This search strategy is implemented by, among others, the Infernal software package.

The Rfam database is a collection of multiple sequence alignments that define a large subset of reliably known RNA motifs and associated information. Its data can be used with the Infernal software to find examples of such RNAs in sequence databases, e.g. genome sequences.

Alternatively, RNA motifs can also be described using explicit search patterns, which define specific primary sequence patterns combined with constraints of where helices should form. Such patterns can be used to find matching subsequences in a large sequence database. Several software packages implement such a search, e.g. RNArobo and RNAmotif.

== Discovery of novel RNA motifs ==
Many methods to discover novel RNAs use a comparative approach, in which different sequences are analyzed together in order to detect characteristic signals of a conserved RNA. When such methods are successful, the resulting novel conserved RNA can be viewed as an RNA motif, expressed using an alignment or a pattern. An early example is the RNA motif based around the T-box, which in 1993 was determined to be associated with aminoacyl-tRNA synthetase genes. The mechanism by which this RNA motif regulates genes was later demonstrated, thus establishing the functional importance of the RNA motif. Later, in 1997, a conserved RNA motif called the B_{12}-box was detected upstream of genes related to B_{12} metabolism. This RNA motif was later found to correspond to a part of a riboswitch that binds the co-factor adenosylcobalamin, which is often called the cobalamin riboswitch. (Later variants were shown to bind other cobalamin derivatives.) Many other examples of RNA motifs whose functions were later determined are known, especially in the context of riboswitches. However, other types of RNA motifs have been functionally characterized, such as bacterial sRNAs like the 6C RNA, which was discovered as a motif in 2007 and functionally characterized in 2016, or ribozymes like the twister ribozyme, which was detected as an RNA motif and functionally characterized in the same publication.
