= RFN =

RFN or Rfn may refer to:

- Rainforest Foundation Norway
- Réseau Ferré National (France)
- Rifleman
- Russian Federation Navy
- FMN riboswitch (also known as RFN element)
