= DUF805 RNA motif =

DUF805
- Consensus secondary structure and sequence conservation of DUF805 RNA

Identifiers
- Symbol: DUF805
- Rfam: RF03081

Other data
- RNA type: Cis-reg
- SO: SO:0005836
- PDB structures: PDBe

The DUF805 RNA motif is a conserved RNA structure that was discovered by bioinformatics. The motif is subdivided into the DUF805 motif and the DUF805b motif, which have similar, but distinct secondary structures. Together, these motifs are found in Bacteroidota, Chlorobiota, and Pseudomonadota.

DUF805 motif RNAs likely function as cis-regulatory elements, in view of their positions upstream of protein-coding genes. Indeed, the RNAs are upstream of multiple genes that encode non-homologous proteins. If all examples of the RNA were upstream of homologous genes, there is the possibility that the RNAs were conserved in that position simply by inheritance. The non-homology of the genes downstream of DUF805 RNAs makes this scenario less likely.

However, the number of different gene classes found downstream of DUF805 RNAs is large in comparison to established cis-regulatory RNAs. This unusual variability in genes raises the possibility that the DUF805 RNA motif has a more general function than cis regulation. A previously proposed example of a more general function is that of a Rho-independent transcription terminator, which terminates transcription (biology) of operons and is also used as a mechanism in cis-regulatory RNAs such as riboswitches. Thus a Rho-independent transcription terminator has a more general function than being an individual cis regulator. However, since some known cis-regulatory RNAs, e.g., cyclic di-GMP riboswitches do control a wide variety of genes, it is possibility that DUF805 RNAs are involved in a regulatory circuit in which many gene classes can participate.
