= Moco-II RNA motif =

Conserved RNA structure

Moco-II RNA
- Consensus secondary structure of Moco-II RNAs

Identifiers
- Symbol: Moco-II RNA
- Rfam: RF01713

Other data
- Domain: Deltaproteobacteria
- PDB structures: PDBe

The Moco-II RNA motif is a conserved RNA structure identified by bioinformatics. However, only eight examples of the RNA motif are known. The RNAs are potentially in the 5' untranslated regions of genes related to molybdenum cofactor (Moco), specifically a gene that encodes a molybdenum-binding domain and a nitrate reductase, which uses Moco as a cofactor. Thus the RNA might be involved in the regulation of genes based on Moco levels. Reliable predictions of Moco-II RNAs are restricted to deltaproteobacteria, but a Moco-II RNA might be present in a betaproteobacterial species. The Moco RNA motif is another RNA that is associated with Moco, and its complex secondary structure and genetic experiments have led to proposals that it is a riboswitch. However, the simpler structure of the Moco-II RNA motif (see diagram) is less typical of riboswitches. Moco-II RNAs are typically followed by a predicted rho-independent transcription terminator.
