= C19H22N6OS =

The molecular formula C_{19}H_{22}N_{6}OS may refer to:

- MK-8189
- Ribocil
