= Gloverin =

Identifiers
- Symbol: Gloverin
- Pfam: PF10793
- InterPro: IPR019729
Available protein structures:
- PDB: IPR019729 PF10793 (ECOD; PDBsum)
- AlphaFold: IPR019729; PF10793

Gloverin is an inducible antibacterial insect protein which inhibits the synthesis of vital outer membrane proteins leading to a permeable outer membrane. Gloverin contains a large number of glycine residues.
