= Glutamine riboswitch =

Glutamine-binding RNA structure

glnA RNA motif
- Consensus secondary structure of glnA RNAs

Identifiers
- Symbol: glnA RNA
- Rfam: RF01739

Other data
- RNA type: Cis-regulatory element; riboswitch
- Domain: cyanobacteria
- GO: GO:0070406 (glutamine binding);
- SO: SO:0000035 (riboswitch);
- PDB structures: PDBe

The glutamine riboswitch (formerly glnA RNA motif) is a conserved RNA structure that was predicted by bioinformatics. It is present in a variety of lineages of cyanobacteria, as well as some phages that infect cyanobacteria. It is also found in DNA extracted from uncultivated bacteria living in the ocean that are presumably species of cyanobacteria.

glnA RNAs are found in the presumed 5' untranslated regions of genes encoding multiple classes of protein that are involved in nitrogen metabolism. The most prominent of these protein classes are ammonium transporters, the enzymes glutamine synthetase and glutamate synthase and P_{II} protein, which itself regulates nitrogen metabolism. Further supporting a possible role as a cis-regulatory element in control of nitrogen metabolism, the Prochlorococcus marinus gene designed as PMT1479 was more repressed than another other gene in this organism when it was growth without a sufficient supply of nitrogen.

It was demonstrated that glnA RNAs correspond to glutamine-binding riboswitches, i.e., they sense glutamine concentrations in order to measure overall nitrogen availability, and regulate the downstream genes appropriately. The original proposal of a riboswitch function was based on the above evidence that glnA RNAs are cis-regulatory, as well as the moderate structural complexity in the three-stem junction of the glnA RNA motif that is comparable to the structures of other known riboswitches. Some glnA RNAs are located adjacent to other glnA RNAs. These "tandem arrangements" are also exhibited by glycine riboswitches and TPP riboswitches where they allow the cell to turn genes off or on within a smaller change of concentration of the riboswitch ligand. In other words, the response curve of the riboswitch better resembles a digital function. However, such cooperative binding was not observed. The first in vivo evidence that the RNAs function as glutamine riboswitches revealed that these riboswitches control expression of the glutamine synthetase inhibiting protein IF17 in Synechocystis sp. PCC 6803 thus representing a pivotal control element for GS activity in Cyanobacteria.

A possible structural resemblance was observed between the glnA RNA motif and the Downstream-peptide motif. The most apparent similarity is between the stems labeled "P1" in each motif, but other similarities were observed. It was proposed that both motifs represent riboswitches involved in nitrogen metabolism. The fact that RNAs from both motifs selectively bind glutamine supports this hypothesis, but detailed structural data is not yet available. The glnA motif has an E-loop structure (also called a bulged-G module) within it.

== See also ==
- Lysine riboswitch
- Glycine riboswitch
