= DEAD RNA motif =

The DEAD RNA motif is a conserved non-coding RNA (ncRNA) found in the introns of DEAD-box RNA helicase genes across land plants. It was identified through a comparative genomics study of 130 plant genomes and is hypothesized to regulate gene expression through alternative splicing and nonsense-mediated decay (NMD).

== Discovery ==
The DEAD RNA motif was identified as part of a systematic search for cis-regulatory ncRNAs in plants, using a comparative genomics pipeline based on covariation. The motif had been partially noted in earlier studies: Burgess and Freeling (2014) reported conserved non-coding sequences overlapping it in Arabidopsis thaliana and Oryza sativa, and Akkuratov et al. (2014) identified the sequences in A. thaliana as evolutionarily conserved. However, its broader distribution and functional significance were established by Sack et al. (2025).

== Distribution ==
The DEAD RNA motif is found in DEAD-box RNA helicase genes across all species of the Tracheophyta (vascular plants) and Bryophyta (mosses) clades represented in the RefSeq database, spanning 115 species from the Embryophyta (land plants). In A. thaliana, it occurs in two paralogous genes: DEAD-box RNA-helicase 1 (DRH1, also known as RH14; locus tag AT3G01540) and a DEAD-box RNA-helicase family gene (RH46; AT5G14610).

== Structure ==
The predicted secondary structure of the DEAD RNA motif is a hairpin loop located within an intron. It presents an 'AG' dinucleotide correspond to an alternative 3' splice site is highly conserved across species, with adenine conserved in all sequences and guanine conserved in 94% of the sequences.

== Function ==
=== Alternative splicing and nonsense-mediate decay ===
The DEAD RNA motif overlaps an alternative 3' splice site in the fourth intron of DRH1 in A. thaliana. RT-PCR experiments detected two splicing variants: the predominant coding variant (AT3G01540.cd) and a less abundant alternative variant (AT3G01540.alt3). The alternative variant accumulates relative to the coding variant in nonsense-mediate decay (NMD), indicating that it is targeted for degradation. This is consistent with the alternative variant containing a premature termination codon (PTC) and a long 3' untranslated region (UTR), both classical features of NMD targets.

=== Proposed autoregulatory mechanism ===
Since DRH1 encodes an RNA helicase and the DEAD RNA motif contains a predicted stem structure, it has been proposed that the finished DRH1 protein may interact with the motif on its own pre-mRNA. One hypothesis is that elevated helicase activity unwinds the DEAD RNA motif's helix, exposing the alternative 3' splice site and promoting formation of the NMD-targeted variant, thereby reducing gene expression. This would constitute an autoregulatory negative feedback loop.

== Significance ==
The DEAD RNA motif is one of only a handful of validated or strongly supported cis-regulatory structured ncRNAs in plants. It joins a small group that includes the thiamin pyrophosphate (TPP) riboswitch and the plant 5S ribosomal RNA mimic (P5SM) as examples of RNA secondary structures that regulate pre-mRNA splicing in plants. The conservation of both the motif and the associated alternative splicing event across diverse land plant lineages is notably rare, as conserved alternative splicing events across multiple species are uncommon in plants.

== See also ==
- Nonsense-mediated mRNA decay
- Alternative splicing
- DEAD-box RNA helicases
