= NiCo riboswitch =

NiCo-AnGGAG
- Consensus secondary structure and sequence conservation of NiCo-AnGGAG riboswitch

Identifiers
- Symbol: NiCo-AnGGAG
- Rfam: RF03164

Other data
- RNA type: Cis-reg
- GO: GO:0046872
- SO: SO:0000035
- PDB structures: PDBe

The NiCo riboswitch is a riboswitch that senses nickel or cobalt ions. Thus, it is an RNA molecule that specifically binds these metal ions, and regulates genes accordingly. The riboswitch is thought to be a part of a system that responds to toxic levels of these metal ions, although the riboswitch might also participate in dealing with the situation where insufficient levels of these trace elements are present in the cell. The crystal structure of a NiCo riboswitch has been determined, and available evidence suggests that the riboswitches bind their metal-ion ligands cooperatively.
