= ManA RNA motif =

manA RNA
- Consensus secondary structure of manA RNAs

Identifiers
- Symbol: manA RNA
- Rfam: RF01745

Other data
- RNA type: Cis-regulatory element
- Domain(s): Photobacterium
- PDB structures: PDBe

The manA RNA motif (also called manA) refers to a conserved RNA structure that was identified by bioinformatics. Instances of the manA RNA motif were detected in bacteria in the genus Photobacterium and phages that infect certain kinds of cyanobacteria. However, most predicted manA RNA sequences are derived from DNA collected from uncultivated marine bacteria. Almost all manA RNAs are positioned such that they might be in the 5' untranslated regions of protein-coding genes, and therefore it was hypothesized that manA RNAs function as cis-regulatory elements. Given the relative complexity of their secondary structure, and their hypothesized cis-regulatory role, they might be riboswitches.

The genes thought to be regulated by manA RNAs are most typically those involved in the metabolism of the sugars fructose and mannose, synthesis of nucleotides, bacterial photosynthesis and a class of protein chaperones known as ibpA. manA RNAs are also often adjacent to transfer RNAs, and are likely transcribed with them. Although these genes are not thought of as typical of phages, it has previously been observed that phages infecting cyanobacteria commonly incorporate such genes.
