= Listeria Hfq binding LhrC =

RNA molecule

Listeria LhrC
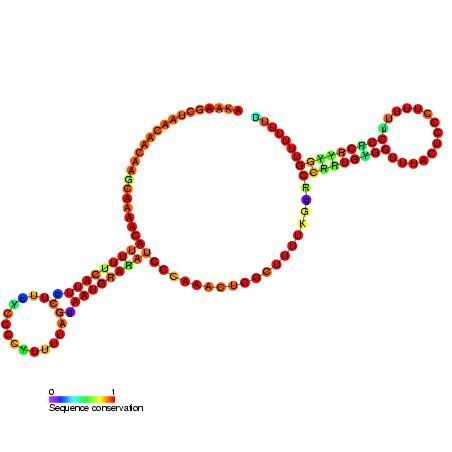
- Predicted secondary structure and sequence conservation of LhrC

Identifiers
- Symbol: LhrC
- Rfam: RF00616

Other data
- RNA type: Gene; sRNA
- Domain(s): Bacteria
- SO: SO:0000655
- PDB structures: PDBe

Listeria LhrC ncRNA was identified by screening for RNA molecules which co-immunoprecipitated with the RNA chaperone Hfq. However, neither the stability nor the activity of LhrC seem to depend on the presence of Hfq. This RNA is transcribed from an intergenic region between the protein coding genes cysK, a putative cysteine synthase and sul, a putative dihydropteroate synthase. In Listeria monocytogenes four additional copies of lhrC have been identified in the genome, three of which are located in tandem repeat upstream of the originally characterised lhrC. This RNA molecule appears to be conserved amongst Listeria species but has not been identified in other bacterial species. It is involved in virulence. The direct mRNA targets of LhrC are the virulence adhesion LapB, and the oligopeptide binding protein OppA. The 3 conserved UCCC motifs common to all copies of LhrC are involved in the mRNA binding and post-transcriptional repression of the target genes. Two other Listerina monocytogenes sRNAs Rli22 and Rli33 contain 2 UCCC motifs and use them to repress oppA mRNA expression.

== See also ==
- Listeria Hfq binding LhrA
