= Downstream-peptide motif =

Downstream-peptide RNA
- Consensus secondary structure of Downstream-peptide RNAs

Identifiers
- Symbol: Downstream-peptide
- Rfam: RF01704

Other data
- RNA type: Cis-regulatory element
- Domain(s): Prochlorococcus and Synechococcus
- PDB structures: PDBe

The Downstream-peptide motif refers to a conserved RNA structure identified by bioinformatics in the cyanobacterial genera Synechococcus and Prochlorococcus and one phage that infects such bacteria. It was also detected in marine samples of DNA from uncultivated bacteria, which are presumably other species of cyanobacteria.

Downstream-peptide RNAs are found upstream of short open reading frames (ORFs) that are predicted to encode short peptides (usually between 17 and 100 amino acids). One of the ORFs is apparently down-regulated when cells are grown with an insufficient supply of nitrogen sources. The Downstream-peptide motif has a structural resemblance to a different candidate RNA structure called the glnA RNA motif which was shown to be a functional glutamine binding riboswitch in cyanobacteria. The most striking similarity is the nucleotide conservation within the P1 stem of both motifs, and this and other similarities was discussed previously.

It was hypothesized that Downstream-peptide RNAs correspond to riboswitches, based on multiple lines of evidence. First, glnA RNAs are often located in the presumed 5′ untranslated regions of multiple classes of genes involved in nitrogen metabolism. This, and other evidence, suggests that glnA RNAs are riboswitches, and their structural similarity to Downstream-peptide RNAs in turn suggests that Downstream-peptide RNAs are also riboswitches. Second, Downstream-peptides are consistently positioned in a place that is consistent with a cis-regulatory role in regulating the downstream ORFs, although the biological role of the ORFs is unknown. Third, the pseudoknot structure has a moderate complexity that is typical of riboswitches. Finally, the observation of regulation of a downstream ORF by nitrogen availability also suggests a cis-regulatory role of the element.

This hypothesis is supported by biochemical and genetic data. First, both Downstream-peptide RNAs and glnA RNAs selectively bind glutamine. Second, reporter gene analysis of the Downstream-peptide motif revealed that this RNA promotes reporter gene expression upon binding of glutamine and can therefore be considered an activating riboswitch. Possible candidates to be regulated by the Downstream-peptide motif are genes that frequently carry the Downstream-peptide motif in their 5′UTR and encode small, unknown proteins that contain DUF4278 and are putative regulators of glutamine synthetase. This hypothesis is supported by the finding that expression of the DUF4278-containing glutamine synthetase inhibitory factor IF17 encoding gene gifB was shown to be regulated by the structurally related glnA RNA motif.

Downstream-peptide RNAs overlap a predicted non-coding RNA called yfr6 that is over 200 nucleotides in length, but it was proposed that only the upstream region (corresponding to the Downstream-peptide motif) functions as an RNA structure. A distinct predicted non-coding RNA called yfr14 overlaps both yfr6 and Downstream-peptide RNAs. However, it is unclear whether yfr6 or yfr14 have any function beyond the now-established role of the Downstream-peptide riboswitch.
