= YdaO/yuaA leader =

RNA structure in bacteria

ydaO/yuaA leader
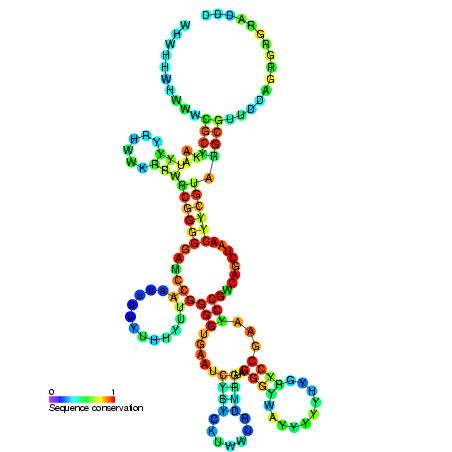
- Predicted secondary structure and sequence conservation of ydaO-yuaA

Identifiers
- Symbol: ydaO-yuaA
- Rfam: RF00379

Other data
- RNA type: Cis-reg; riboswitch
- Domain(s): Bacteria
- SO: SO:0000233
- PDB structures: PDBe

The YdaO/YuaA leader (now called the cyclic di-AMP riboswitch) is a conserved RNA structure found upstream of the ydaO and yuaA genes in Bacillus subtilis and related genes in other bacteria. Its secondary structure and gene associations were predicted by bioinformatics.

These RNAs function as riboswitches, and sense the signaling molecule cyclic di-AMP. The interaction between the riboswitch and c-di-AMP has been revealed in atomic-resolution structures.
