= Mini-ykkC RNA motif =

mini-ykkC RNA motif
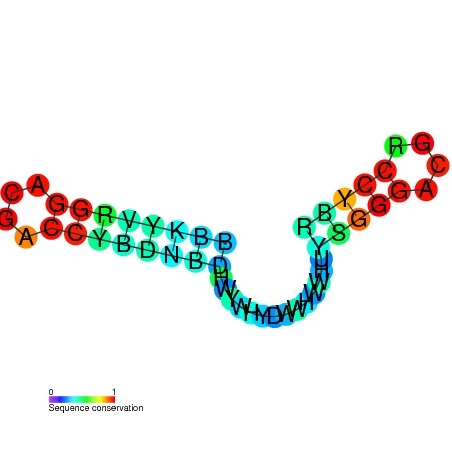
- Predicted secondary structure and sequence conservation of mini-ykkC

Identifiers
- Symbol: mini-ykkC
- Rfam: RF01068

Other data
- RNA type: Cis-reg
- Domain(s): Bacteria
- SO: SO:0005836
- PDB structures: PDBe

The mini-ykkC RNA motif (later renamed Guanidine-II riboswitch) was discovered as a putative RNA structure that is conserved in bacteria. The motif consists of two conserved stem-loops whose terminal loops contain the RNA sequence ACGR, where R represents either A or G. Mini-ykkC RNAs are widespread in Pseudomonadota, but some are predicted in other phyla of bacteria. It was expected that the RNAs are cis-regulatory elements, because they are typically located upstream of protein-coding genes.

The genes that are apparently controlled by mini-ykkC RNAs bear a resemblance to the genes controlled by ykkC-yxkD leader (guanidine-I), and nine gene families are common to both. Therefore, it was proposed that these two RNA classes have the same function. The complex structure and many conserved nucleotides found in the ykkC-yxkD leader are not present in the mini-ykkC RNA motif. Despite this, it was shown that each of the mini-ykkC two stem-loop structures directly binds free guanidine. Therefore, mini-ykkC RNA motif represents a distinct class of guanidine-sensing RNAs called Guanidine-II riboswitch. Its crystal structure was also determined.

Consensus secondary structure of mini-ykkC RNAs. Layout is similar to that used in a previously published drawing.
