= Cyclic di-GMP-II riboswitch =

- Consensus secondary structure of cyclic di-GMP-II riboswitches

Identifiers
- Symbol: c-di-GMP-II
- Rfam: RF01786

Other data
- RNA type: Riboswitch
- Domain(s): Clostridia, Deinococcus
- PDB structures: PDBe

c-di-GMP-II-GAG
- Consensus secondary structure and sequence conservation of c-di-GMP-II-GAG riboswitch

Identifiers
- Symbol: c-di-GMP-II-GAG
- Rfam: RF03169

Other data
- RNA type: Cis-reg
- GO: GO:0010468,GO:0035438
- SO: SO:0000035
- PDB structures: PDBe

c-di-GMP-II-GCG
- Consensus secondary structure and sequence conservation of c-di-GMP-II-GCG riboswitch

Identifiers
- Symbol: c-di-GMP-II-GCG
- Rfam: RF03170

Other data
- RNA type: Cis-reg
- GO: GO:0010468,GO:0035438
- SO: SO:0000035
- PDB structures: PDBe

Cyclic di-GMP-II riboswitches (also c-di-GMP-II riboswitches) form a class of riboswitches that specifically bind cyclic di-GMP, a second messenger used in multiple bacterial processes such as virulence, motility and biofilm formation. Cyclic di-GMP II riboswitches are structurally unrelated to cyclic di-GMP-I riboswitches, though they have the same function.

Cyclic di-GMP-II riboswitches were discovered by bioinformatics, and are common in species within the class Clostridia and the genus Deinococcus. They are also found in some other bacterial lineages. There is significant overlap between species that use cyclic di-GMP-I and cyclic di-GMP-II riboswitches, as both riboswitch classes are common in Clostridia.

In Clostridioides difficile (bacteria) strains, a cyclic di-GMP-II riboswitch is found adjacent to a group I catalytic intron. Group I introns are ribozymes that catalyze the splicing of the RNA molecule in which they are embedded. In the riboswitch-associated case, the outcome of the splicing reaction catalyzed by the intron is controlled by the riboswitch in response to cyclic di-GMP levels. The splicing reaction is also regulated in vitro by levels of guanosine triphosphate, since group I introns require a guanosine derivative for their activity.

Group I introns function as part of selfish elements, where they reduce the likelihood that the element will negatively impact the fitness of the host by interrupting a protein-coding gene. However, the group I intron associated with a cyclic di-GMP-II riboswitch is not selfish since it seems to perform a useful function for the cell. They also show that natural cells use allosteric ribozymes to regulate gene expression, a mechanism commonly used in engineered aptamers but not previously observed in nature.

Cyclic di-GMP-II riboswitches are a pseudoknotted structure. Most of these riboswitches conserve a kink turn structural motif that permits a bend in the relevant stem, presumably facilitating the pseudoknot. Several nucleotide positions are highly conserved, with many around the terminal loops involved in the pseudoknot interaction.
