= SAH riboswitch =

S-adenosyl-L-homocysteine riboswitch
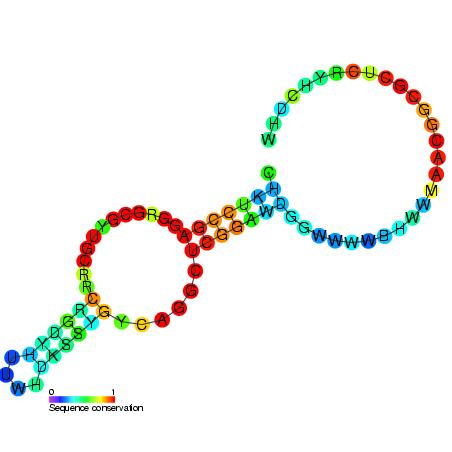
- Predicted secondary structure and sequence conservation of SAH_riboswitch

Identifiers
- Symbol: SAH_riboswitch
- Rfam: RF01057

Other data
- RNA type: Cis-reg; riboswitch
- Domain(s): Bacteria
- SO: SO:0005836
- PDB structures: PDBe

SAH riboswitches are a kind of riboswitch that bind S-adenosylhomocysteine (SAH). When the coenzyme S-adenosylmethionine (SAM) is used in a methylation reaction, SAH is produced. SAH riboswitches typically up-regulate genes involved in recycling SAH to create more SAM (or the metabolically related methionine). This is particularly relevant to cells, because high levels of SAH can be toxic. Originally identified by bioinformatics, SAH riboswitches are apparent in many species of bacteria, predominantly certain Pseudomonadota and Actinomycetota. The atomic-resolution 3-dimensional structure of an SAH riboswitch has been solved using X-ray crystallography.

Consensus secondary structure of SAH riboswitches. Layout is similar to that used in a published depiction. Three base pairs in this secondary structure were incorrectly predicted, while an additional base pair is missing, as revealed by an atomic-resolution tertiary structure.
