= Pfl RNA motif =

pfl RNA
- Consensus secondary structure of pfl RNAs

Identifiers
- Symbol: pfl
- Rfam: RF01750

Other data
- RNA type: Cis-regulatory element
- Domain(s): Bacteria
- PDB structures: PDBe

The pfl RNA motif (now called the ZMP/ZTP riboswitch) refers to a conserved RNA structure present in some bacteria and originally discovered using bioinformatics. pfl RNAs are consistently present in genomic locations that likely correspond to the 5' untranslated regions (5' UTRs) of protein-coding genes. This arrangement in bacteria is commonly associated with cis-regulatory elements. Moreover, they are in presumed 5' UTRs of multiple non-homologous genes, suggesting that they function only in these locations. Additional evidence of cis-regulatory function came from the observation that predicted rho-independent transcription terminators overlap pfl RNAs. This overlap suggests that the alternate secondary structures of pfl RNA and the transcription terminator stem-loops compete with each other, and this is a common mechanism for cis gene control in bacteria.

pfl RNAs are found in a variety of phyla of bacteria, but are not found in all the species of that phylum. pfl RNAs are common among species of orders Actinomycetales and Clostridiales, the classes Alphaproteobacteria and Betaproteobacteria and the genus Deinococcus. They are also found in isolated species of Bacteroidota, Chloroflexota, and Deltaproteobacteria.

Several lines of evidence led to the hypothesis that pfl RNAs function as riboswitches. First, the above evidence that pfl RNAs correspond to cis-regulatory elements is consistent with most known riboswitches. Second, their relatively complex pseudoknotted secondary structure is typical of riboswitches. Finally, several nucleotide positions are highly conserved despite the large evolutionary distance between species that use pfl RNAs; this high level of conservation is often a consequence of the need to form intricate structures to specifically bind a metabolite. Experimental evidence already supported the hypothesis that pfl RNAs function as cis regulatory elements, before the ligand was confirmed to be ZTP, as well as ZMP (also called AICAR), in 2015.

The genes presumed to be regulated by pfl RNAs relate to one-carbon metabolism. Most obviously, for example, formate-tetrahydrofolate ligase synthesizes 10-formyltetrahydrofolate. The glyA and folD convert between other one-carbon adducts of tetrahydrofolate. Another gene commonly associated with pfl RNAs is purH, which catalyzes the formylation of the intermediate AICAR in de novo synthesis of purines. The formyl group is taken from formyltetrahydrofolate, and purine biosynthesis is often the dominant user of formyltetrahydrofolate. In similar fashions, if less directly, most pfl RNAs are associated with genes that are directly or indirectly involved in one-carbon metabolism. It appears that the ZTP/ZMP purine derivatives can be used to regulate one-carbon metabolism by indirectly sensing a shortage of 10-formyl-tetrahydrofolate.

The atomic-resolution structure has been solved by X-ray crystallography.

== See also ==
- Tetrahydrofolate riboswitch
- Purine riboswitch
