= FMN riboswitch =

Highly conserved RNA element

FMN riboswitch (RFN element)
- Predicted secondary structure and sequence conservation of FMN

Identifiers
- Symbol: FMN
- Alt. Symbols: RFN
- Rfam: RF00050

Other data
- RNA type: Cis-reg; riboswitch
- Domain: Bacteria
- GO: GO:0010181
- SO: SO:0000035
- PDB structures: PDBe

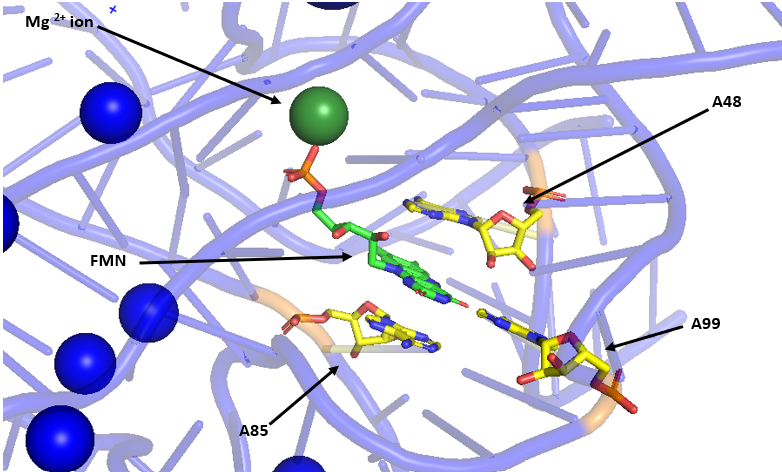
Pictured is a FMN molecule bound in the binding sit of the FMN riboswitch. Adenine nucleotides A48, A85, and A99 (depicted with yellow carbons), as well as a positively charged magnesium ion (green) assist in binding. The planar isoalloxazine ring system of FMN (FMN depicted with green carbons) intercalates between A48 and A85. Uracil-like edges of the FMN ring system form specific Watson–Crick-like hydrogen bonds with the highly conserved A99 residue on the riboswitch. Lastly, the negatively charged phosphate group of FMN interacts with the positively charged magnesium ion, allowing this riboswitch to exhibit selectivity for the FMN. PDB code: 3F2Q

The FMN riboswitch (also known as RFN element) is a highly conserved RNA element which is naturally occurring, and is found frequently in the 5'-untranslated regions of prokaryotic mRNAs that encode for flavin mononucleotide (FMN) biosynthesis and transport proteins. This element is a metabolite-dependent riboswitch that directly binds FMN in the absence of proteins, thus giving it the ability to regulate RNA expression by responding to changes in the concentration of FMN. In Bacillus subtilis, previous studies have shown that this bacterium utilizes at least two FMN riboswitches, where one controls translation initiation, and the other controls premature transcription termination. Regarding the second riboswitch in Bacilius subtilis, premature transcription termination occurs within the 5' untranslated region of the ribDEAHT operon, precluding access to the ribosome-binding site of ypaA mRNA. FMN riboswitches also have various magnesium and potassium ions dispersed throughout the nucleotide structure, some of which participate in binding of FMN.

In the bacterium Fusobacterium nucleatum, FMN binding has been studied. The FMN riboswitch is able to selectively bind the FMN molecule due to several distinct nucleic acid residues, as well as some of the magnesium ions present in the overall riboswitch structure. FMN's planar isoalloxazine ring system intercalates between A48 and A85 residues on the riboswitch, thereby providing a continuous stacking alignment. Further, the uracil-like edge of the ring system forms specific Watson–Crick-like hydrogen bonds with a highly conserved A99 residue on the riboswitch. An additional structural moiety of FMN, the ribityl group, uses one of its four oxygens for hydrogen bonding, whereas phosphate oxygens form additional hydrogen bonds with Watson–Crick edges of several conserved guanines. The interaction between the phosphate of FMN and the RNA is also bridged by a magnesium ion, which directly coordinates the phosphate oxygen of FMN and a G33 residue, and forms several water-mediated contacts with neighboring nucleotides.

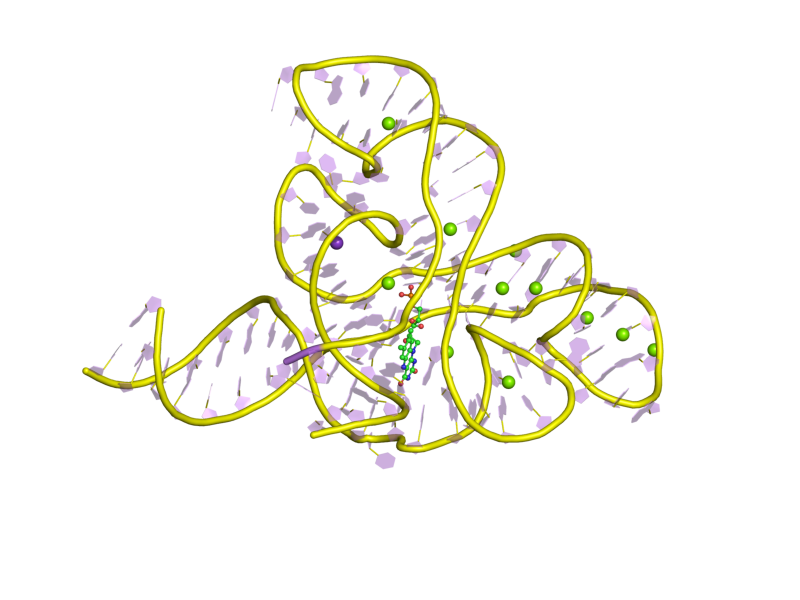
A representation of the 3D structure of the FMN riboswitch. This derived from a crystal structure of the FMN riboswitch bound to FMN.

== Function ==
The function of the FMN riboswitch is twofold; first, riboswitches contain an aptamer component, which allows this RNA molecule to bind to its target molecule, FMN, resulting in a series of conformational changes. These conformational changes occur between the bound and unbound states, and are contingent upon the presence or absence of FMN. Previous research has proposed that this riboswitch operates by forming an intrinsic terminator stem when FMN is present in sufficient amounts but folds into an alternative structure when FMN is absent. Additional studies conducted on this riboswitch also suggest that these conformational changes in the structure of the FMN riboswitch are localized to specific nucleotide regions that form the binding pocket of this molecule. These findings are congruent with binding events seen in other riboswitches and RNA molecules. The second function of the FMN riboswitch is an expression platform, which either inhibits or activates expression of the genes associated with FMN.

== Role in disease ==
While riboswitches are not present in mammalian eukaryotic cells, they are present in prokaryotic cells, thus making them possible targets for antibiotic drug development. Special interest is had with FMN riboswitches present in Fusobacterium nucleatum, as this bacterium plays a role in periodontal disease and other human infections, and is considered one of the most pathogenic bacteria of the genus. The inherent plasticity of the FMN-binding pocket and the availability of large openings make the FMN riboswitch an attractive target for the structure-based design of analog FMN antimicrobial compounds.

Some small molecules which act as novel binders to the FMN riboswitch binding site have been discovered, including roseoflavin, and 5FDQD, which are structural analogues of FMN. Ribocil, a more structurally unique compound, was also found to be a potent binder to the FMN riboswitch in a phenotypical screen performed by Merck & Co.

== See also ==
- Lysine riboswitch
- SAM riboswitch
- Tetrahydrofolate riboswitch
- TPP riboswitch
