= Cobalamin riboswitch =

- Predicted secondary structure and sequence conservation of Cobalamin

Identifiers
- Symbol: Cobalamin
- Rfam: RF00174

Other data
- RNA type: Cis-reg; riboswitch
- Domain: Bacteria
- SO: SO:0000035
- PDB structures: PDBe 6VMY

Cobalamin riboswitch is a cis-regulatory element which is widely distributed in 5' untranslated regions of vitamin B_{12} (Cobalamin) related genes in bacteria.

Cobalamin (vitamin B_{12}, coenzyme B_{12} ) riboswitches are structured RNA elements that regulate adjacent genes related to cobalamin metabolism in response to cobalamin binding. Riboswitches are RNA-based genetic regulatory elements present in the 5' untranslated region (5'UTR) of primarily bacterial RNA. These switches bind to a ligand, which is generally a metabolite, with high affinity and specificity. Ligand binding mediates allosteric rearrangement of mRNA structure, and this results in modulation of gene expression or translation of mRNA to yield a protein. The cobalamin riboswitch, along with most other riboswitches, are cis-regulatory. This means they regulate genes involved in the same metabolic pathways as the metabolite they bind, which creates regulation through a negative feedback loop. Riboswitches are grouped into classes by the ligand that they bind because the ligand-binding or aptamer domain is highly conserved across species. Riboswitches, including the cobalamin riboswitch, have garnered a lot of attention recently due to their therapeutic and synthetic potential, as well as their interesting structural properties. As of 2019, cobalamin riboswitches have been identified in over 5000 species of bacteria.

== Ligand selectivity ==
Cobalamin riboswitches bind cobalamin (vitamin B12), which is a complex enzyme cofactor composed of a corrin ring coordinated to a cobalt (III) ion. In the alpha-axial position, the cobalt is coordinated to a dimethylbenzimidazole moiety attached to the corrin ring via a flexible aminopropanol linker. The active portion of the cofactor is in the beta-axial position. Methylcobalamin (MeCbl) and adenosylcobalamin (AdoCbl) are the biologically active forms of cobalamin, containing a methyl group and an adenosyl moiety in the beta-axial position, respectively. Hydroxocobalamin (HyCbl), with a hydroxyl group in the beta-axial position, is produced as a result of cobalamin photolysis, and is present in biological conditions but is not in an active form. Cyanocobalamin (CyCbl) is an artificial form of cobalamin found in supplements, which can be converted to active forms of cobalamin. Cobalamin riboswitches can exhibit selectivity toward different forms of cobalamin.

== Structure and classes ==
Riboswitches, including the cobalamin riboswitch, are generally composed of a ligand-binding or aptamer domain and an expression platform. Ligand binding induces an allosteric structural rearrangement in the expression platform that results in the regulation of gene expression via transcriptional or translational mechanisms.

=== Class I (Cbl-I) ===
Cobalamin riboswitches are broadly classified by the identity of the aptamer, but can be further classified into Class I (Cbl-I) and Class II (Cbl-II) based on cobalamin analogue selectivity and peripheral structural elements. Cbl-I and Cbl-II riboswitches share a conserved receptor domain composed of a four-way junction and regulatory domain. Cbl-I riboswitches are selective for AdoCbl, with a variable peripheral stem loop structure facilitating ligand specificity. Over 90% of cobalamin riboswitches identified before 2003 are Cbl-I riboswitches.

=== Class IIa (Cbl-IIa) ===
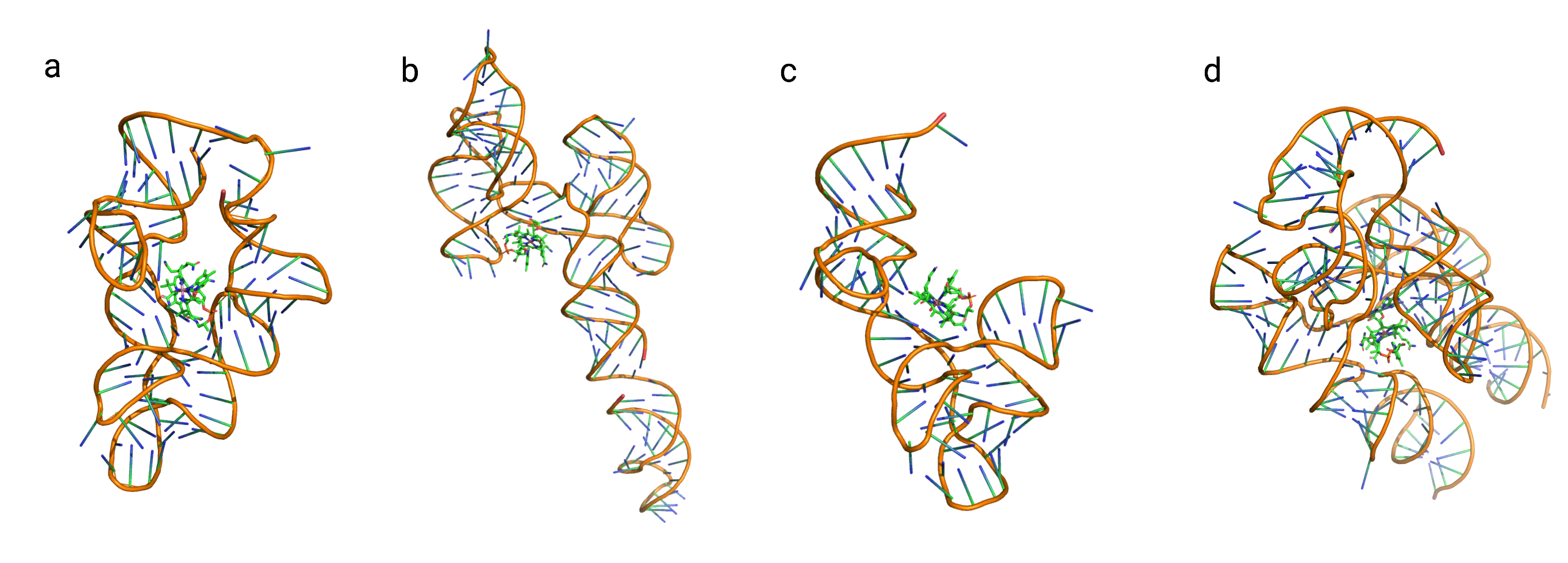
VB_{12}-bound Riboswitches with PDB codes: a) 4FRN b) 6VMY c) 4FRG d) 4GMA

Cbl-II can be further divided into two classes (Cbl-IIa and Cbl-IIb). Cbl-IIa riboswitches are specific to cobalamin analogues with smaller β-axial ligands including MeCbl and HyCbl. This selectivity is determined by peripheral element variations.

=== Class IIb (Cbl-IIb) ===
Cbl-IIb riboswitches are also selective for AdoCbl, but they differ significantly in structure from Cbl-I riboswitches. The structural basis for AdoCbl selectivity has not yet been determined. Cbl-IIb riboswitches also differ in terms of the nature of the genes they regulate, with Cbl-IIb riboswitches primarily associated with genes involved in ethanolamine utilization. Ethanolamine is abundant in the human intestinal tract as it is the product of the breakdown of the phosphatidylethanolamine from cell membranes and is also present in processed food. Most bacteria that inhabit the intestinal tract can utilize ethanolamine as a carbon and nitrogen source by upregulating the expression of the ethanolamine utilization genes; this may have a survival advantage. The expression of the ethanolamine utilization genes (eutG) is influenced by two different mechanisms. The first is a two component regulatory system that senses the presence of ethanolamine and the second mechanism is an AdoCbl riboswitch that senses the presence of AdoCbl, a cofactor needed for the breakdown of ethanolamine. A study showed that both these regulatory elements need to be activated for the bacteria to grow efficiently on medium containing ethanolamine. Bioinformatic studies were initially unsuccessful in identifying AdoCbl riboswitches within the bacteria genomes, but subsequent studies of the intergenic regions of the eutG locus using Ribex identified an RNA element between the eutT and eutG genes.

In addition, some cobalamin riboswitches exhibit promiscuous ligand binding, such as the B. subtilis yvrC riboswitch, which can adopt different structural conformations in order to bind cobalamin analogues with smaller β-axial ligands such as MeCbl and HyCbl in addition to AdoCbl, which has a much bulker β-axial moiety. This riboswitch is also capable of binding CyCbl.

== Discovery ==
Before proof of riboswitch function, a conserved sequence motif called the B_{12} box was identified that corresponds to a part of the cobalamin riboswitch, and a more complete conserved structure was identified. Variants of the riboswitch consensus have been identified. Before a broader range of cobalamin riboswitches were identified, it was believed that only AdoCbl riboswitches existed.

== Mechanism ==
The mechanisms of individual cobalamin riboswitches can vary and many have not yet been elucidated. The four canonical mechanisms for riboswitches include transcriptional activation or repression and translational activation or repression. In transcriptional activation, a terminator loop, which blocks the RNA polymerase binding site, is present in the absence of ligand and upon ligand binding, an anti-terminator loop forms and the terminator hairpin is removed. Transcriptional termination occurs when the terminator stem loop forms in the presence of a ligand. Regulation via translational activation occurs when the Shine-Dalgarno (SD) sequence, necessary for the ribosome to bind to the mRNA and initiate translation, is sequestered within tertiary structural elements when the ligand is unbound and is made accessible after the riboswitch undergoes a ligand-induced conformational change. In translational repression, the SD is sequestered upon ligand binding. The E. coli btuB AdoCbl riboswitch and confirmed to regulate gene expression via a translational repression mechanism, as well as the env8 HyCbl riboswitch.

== Regulated Genes ==
The cobalamin riboswitch is known to regulate a broad range of genes involved in cobalamin metabolism, including those genes coding for proteins involved in cobalamin biosynthesis and transport. Examples include regulation of the btuB gene in E. coli which codes for a cobalamin transport protein, regulation of CobA, an enzyme which converts uroporphyrinogen III to precorrin-2 during cobalamin biosynthesis in P. freudenreichiii, and the cobalamin biosynthesis (cob) operon in S. typhimurium among others.

== Applications ==
=== As drug targets ===
The emerging threat of antibiotic resistance highlights the need for novel antibiotic development. riboswitches, including cobalamin riboswitches, are currently being investigated as potential targets for novel antibiotics. Not only do they regulate essential metabolic processes, they are also primarily found in prokaryotes. Only one riboswitch (the TPP riboswitch) has been identified in some plant cells to date, and no riboswitches have been identified in mammalian cells. By targeting bacteria-specific regulatory mechanisms, the risk of host side-effects is minimized. Furthermore, the mechanism in which a ligand binds to its riboswitch is inherently different from how a protein binds that same ligand, thus minimizing interference between the two systems.

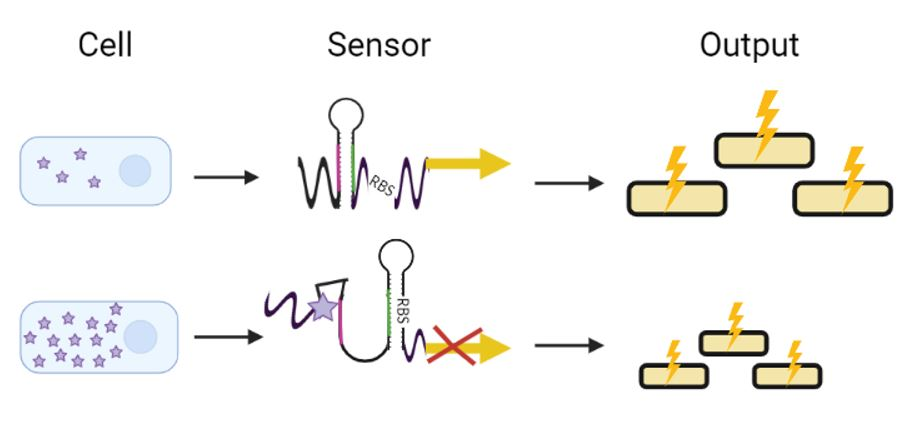
A basic schematic is shown here where the purple stars indicate the metabolite and the yellow arrow shows the reporter gene. The cells with a lower concentration of the metabolite have more riboswitches in the unbound state. The unbound conformation has an unstructured interaction between the ribosome binding site (RBS) and the blue and green segments. This unstructured interaction allows for the reporter gene to be translated efficiently downstream and produce a high signal output. At a higher metabolite concentration, the riboswitches form a bound conformation where the blue segment of the riboswitch interacts with the target RNA. This allows the green segment to interact with the RBS instead, and this allows the RBs to inhibit translation initiation of the reporter gene. Because of this, the signal output is lower than with the low concentration of the metabolite.

A bioinformatic study performed in 2019, which analyzed eight different riboswitch classes for suitability as antibacterial drug targets, classified the cobalamin riboswitch as being partially suitable for targeting with antibiotics. As of 2019, cobalamin riboswitches were found in 5174 bacterial species, 7% of which are human pathogens. The development of antibiotics targeting the cobalamin riboswitch is hindered due to the fact that not all cobalamin biosynthetic pathways are regulated by riboswitches, meaning that antibiotics targeting the riboswitch would need to be used in conjunction with additional drugs targeting alternative synthetic pathways in order to be effective. As of 2021, no therapeutics targeting the cobalamin riboswitch are being developed.

=== As biosensors ===
Riboswitches are ideally suited to be engineered into biosensors due to their ability to undergo a conformational switch upon binding to specific ligands. These sensors are constructed with a cobalamin riboswitch upstream of a gene encoding for a reporter molecule. The nature of the reporter molecule can vary depending on the desired detection method. For example, the reporter gene can encode for green fluorescent protein (GFP) when fluorescence-based detection methods are desired. In the presence of ligand, the riboswitch undergoes a conformational change which blocks the ribosomal binding site, halting transcription of the reporter gene.

In 2010, researchers designed the first riboswitch-based AdoCbl sensor in E. coli. This sensor was also used to detect vitamin B_{12} biosynthetic precursors such as cobinamide and confirm the involvement of specific genes in cobalamin metabolism. More recently, this sensor was used to screen Ensifer meliloti mutants for their ability to synthesize large quantities of Vitamin B_{12}. Riboswitch sensors can be utilized outside of a cellular environment. For example, a biosensor developed from a Propionibacterium freudenreichii cobalamin riboswitch was used to determine the vitamin B_{12} concentration in fermented food with high sensitivity.
