= Listeria Hfq binding LhrA =

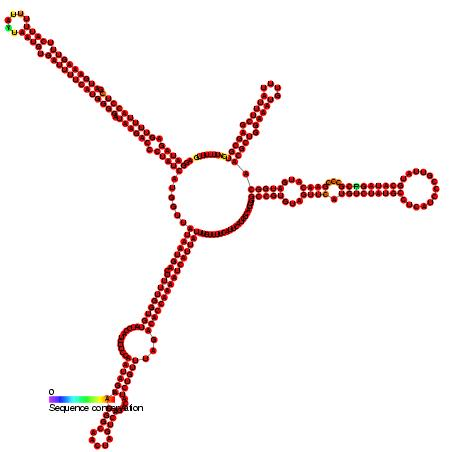
- Predicted secondary structure and sequence conservation of LhrA

Identifiers
- Symbol: LhrA
- Rfam: RF00615

Other data
- RNA type: Gene; sRNA
- Domain: Bacteria
- GO: GO:0003729
- SO: SO:0000655
- PDB structures: PDBe

Listeria Hfq binding LhrA is a ncRNA that was identified by screening for RNA molecules which co-immunoprecipitated with the RNA chaperone Hfq. This RNA is transcribed from a region overlapping with a predicted protein of unknown function (Lmo2257) and is located between a putative intracellular protease and a putative protein of the ribulose-phosphate 3 epimerase family. It is highly expressed in the stationary growth phase but the function is unknown. It is proposed to be a regulatory RNA which controls gene expression at the post transcriptional level by binding the target mRNA in an Hfq dependent fashion. This RNA molecule appears to be conserved amongst Listeria species but has not been identified in other bacterial species.

== See also ==
- Listeria Hfq binding LhrC
