= Thiamine kinase =

Class of enzymes

Thiamin kinase

Identifiers
- EC no.: 2.7.1.89
- CAS no.: 62213-38-1

Databases
- IntEnz: IntEnz view
- BRENDA: BRENDA entry
- ExPASy: NiceZyme view
- KEGG: KEGG entry
- MetaCyc: metabolic pathway
- PRIAM: profile
- PDB structures: RCSB PDB PDBe PDBsum
- Gene Ontology: AmiGO / QuickGO
Search
- PMC: articles
- PubMed: articles
- NCBI: proteins

Thiamine kinase (EC 2.7.1.89) is an enzyme that catalyzes the chemical reaction

ATP +
thiamine
ADP +
thiamine monophosphate

The enzyme characterised from Escherichia coli converts thiamine to thiamine monophosphate by transferring a phosphate group from the cofactor, adenosine triphosphate (ATP), which is converted to adenosine diphosphate (ADP).

This enzyme is a transferase, specifically one transferring phosphorus-containing groups (phosphotransferases) with an alcohol group as acceptor. The systematic name of this enzyme class is ATP:thiamine phosphotransferase. Other names in common use include thiamin kinase (phosphorylating), thiamin phosphokinase, ATP:thiamin phosphotransferase, and thiamin kinase. This enzyme participates in thiamine metabolism.
