= Ribocil =

Names
- IUPAC name 2-[1-[[2-(methylamino)pyrimidin-5-yl]methyl]piperidin-3-yl]-4-thiophen-2-yl-1H-pyrimidin-6-one

Identifiers
CAS Number	1381289-58-2
3D model (JSmol)	Interactive image
ChEMBL	ChEMBL5266420
ChemSpider	29906465
PubChem CID	136881500
- InChI: InChI=1S/C19H22N6OS/c1-20-19-21-9-13(10-22-19)11-25-6-2-4-14(12-25)18-23-15(8-17(26)24-18)16-5-3-7-27-16/h3,5,7-10,14H,2,4,6,11-12H2,1H3,(H,20,21,22)(H,23,24,26) Key: ZSXCVAIJFUEGJR-UHFFFAOYSA-N
- SMILES: CNC1=NC=C(C=N1)CN2CCCC(C2)C3=NC(=CC(=O)N3)C4=CC=CS4

Properties
Chemical formula	C_{19}H_{22}N_{6}OS
Molar mass	382.49 g·mol^{−1}
- Except where otherwise noted, data are given for materials in their standard state (at 25 °C [77 °F], 100 kPa). Infobox references

Ribocil is chemical compound which is found to be a potent inhibitor of the FMN riboswitch, meaning it could serve as a promising lead compound for developing a new antibiotic class. The compound was discovered by Merck & Co. through a phenotypic screen of the Gram-positive bacteria Staphylococcus aureus. The binding mode of this small molecule to its binding site has been confirmed through the use of X-Ray crystallography.

== Binding mode ==
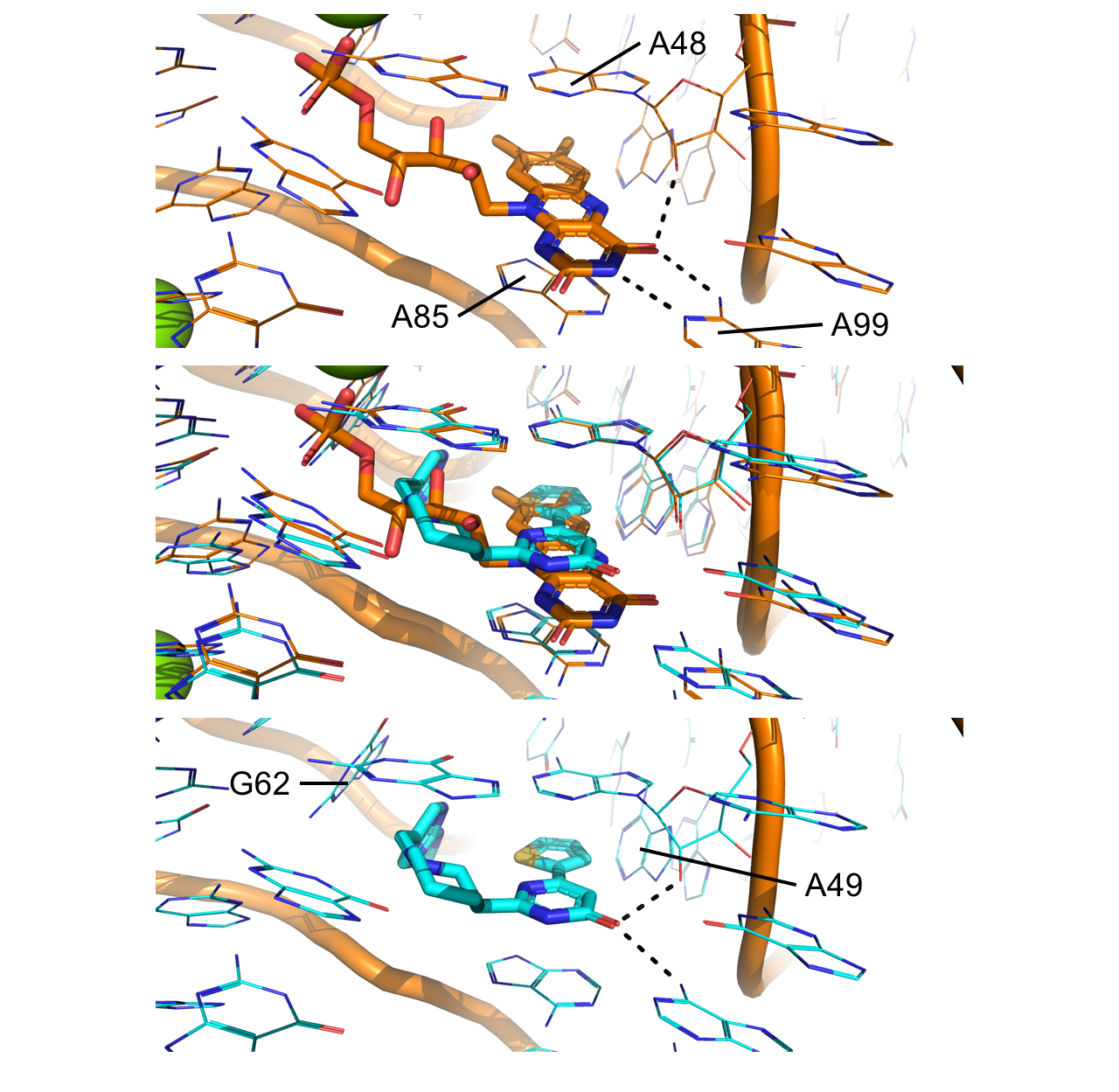
X-Ray crystallography of the FMN riboswitch bound to FMN (upper, PDB code: 2yie) and ribocil (lower, PDB code: 5c45) and juxtaposed (middle). Residues which form interactions with the binders are highlighted with text.

The structure of ribocil versus previously discovered binders to the FMN riboswitch makes it unique, as it is not a structural analogue to the natural ligand, flavin mononucleotide (FMN). The binding mode of this compound has some similarities with ribocil, where the same π-π stacking interaction and two hydrogen bond is also conserved. Ribocil also makes two new contacts with the binding site which notably differs from FMN: a π-π interaction between the aminopyrimidine of ribocil and residue G62 and an edge-face π-interaction.

== Challenges and derivatives ==
One major obstacle of using ribocil as a bona fide antibiotic is that although it kills bacteria in culture, Gram-positive organisms can scavenge riboflavin from their environment. While ribocil in itself has no activity towards Gram-negative bacteria, derivatives of ribocil which enhance the accumulative properties of these compounds have been synthesized to show whole-cell activity against wild-type strains of these bacteria.
