= Cyclic di-GMP-I riboswitch =

c-di-GMP-I
- Consensus secondary structure and sequence conservation of Cyclic di-GMP-I riboswitch

Identifiers
- Symbol: c-di-GMP-I
- Rfam: RF01051

Other data
- RNA type: Cis-reg
- GO: GO:0035438
- SO: SO:0005836
- PDB structures: PDBe

c-di-GMP-I-GGC
- Consensus secondary structure and sequence conservation of c-di-GMP-I-GGC riboswitch

Identifiers
- Symbol: c-di-GMP-I-GGC
- Rfam: RF03167

Other data
- RNA type: Cis-reg
- GO: GO:0035438
- SO: SO:0005836
- PDB structures: PDBe

c-di-GMP-I-UAU
- Consensus secondary structure and sequence conservation of c-di-GMP-I-UAU riboswitch

Identifiers
- Symbol: c-di-GMP-I-UAU
- Rfam: RF03168

Other data
- RNA type: Cis-reg
- GO: GO:0035438
- SO: SO:0005836
- PDB structures: PDBe

Cyclic di-GMP-I riboswitches are a class of riboswitch that specifically bind cyclic di-GMP, which is a second messenger that is used in a variety of microbial processes including virulence, motility and biofilm formation. Cyclic di-GMP-I riboswitches were originally identified by bioinformatics as a conserved RNA-like structure called the "GEMM motif". These riboswitches are present in a wide variety of bacteria, and are most common in Clostridia and certain varieties of Pseudomonadota. The riboswitches are present in pathogens such as Clostridioides difficile, Vibrio cholerae (which causes cholera) and Bacillus anthracis (which causes anthrax). Geobacter uraniumreducens is predicted to have 30 instances of this riboswitch in its genome. A bacteriophage that infects C. difficile is predicted to carry a cyclic di-GMP-I riboswitch, which it might use to detect and exploit the physiological state of bacteria that it infects.

The discovery of this riboswitch class answers the question of how genes are regulated in response to cyclic di-GMP levels in many different bacteria. However, some bacteria in which cyclic di-GMP has been studied lack cyclic di-GMP-I riboswitches, e.g. Pseudomonas aeruginosa. Cyclic di-GMP-I riboswitches are the first kind of riboswitch to be discovered whose role is not primarily in regulating metabolism, but is instead part of signaling. A second class of riboswitch that binds cyclic di-GMP is called the cyclic di-GMP-II riboswitch. The two classes of cyclic di-GMP-binding riboswitches do not share any known sequence or structural features.

High-resolution three-dimensional structures of cyclic di-GMP-I riboswitches have been determined using X-ray crystallography.

Some homologs of the c-di-GMP-I riboswitch structure actually function a riboswitches that recognize another signaling molecule, cyclic AMP-GMP.
