= Tetrahydrofolate riboswitch =

Class of homologous RNAs

- Consensus secondary structure of tetrahydrofolate (THF) riboswitches

Identifiers
- Symbol: THF riboswitch
- Rfam: RF01831

Other data
- RNA type: Riboswitch
- Domain(s): Clostridiales, Lactobacillales
- PDB structures: PDBe

Tetrahydrofolate riboswitches are a class of homologous RNAs in certain bacteria that bind tetrahydrofolate (THF). It is almost exclusively located in the probable 5' untranslated regions of protein-coding genes, and most of these genes are known to encode either folate transporters or enzymes involved in folate metabolism. For these reasons it was inferred that the RNAs function as riboswitches. THF riboswitches are found in a variety of Bacillota, specifically the orders Clostridiales and Lactobacillales, and more rarely in other lineages of bacteria. The THF riboswitch was one of many conserved RNA structures found in a project based on comparative genomics. The 3-d structure of the tetrahydrofolate riboswitch has been solved by separate groups using X-ray crystallography. These structures were deposited into the Protein Data Bank under accessions 3SD1 and 3SUX, with other entries containing variants.

== See also ==
- Pfl RNA motif
