= Lysine riboswitch =

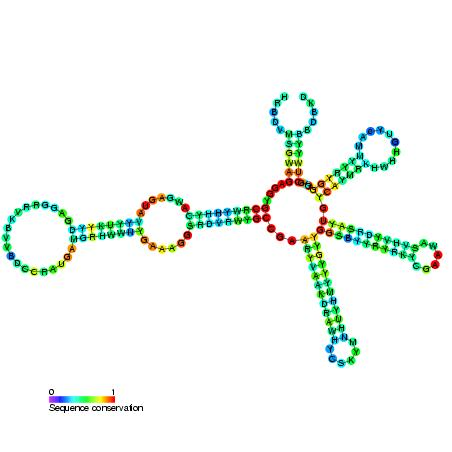
- Predicted secondary structure and sequence conservation of Lysine riboswitch

Identifiers
- Symbol: Lysine
- Rfam: RF00168

Other data
- RNA type: Cis-reg; riboswitch
- Domain: Bacteria
- SO: SO:0000035
- PDB structures: PDBe

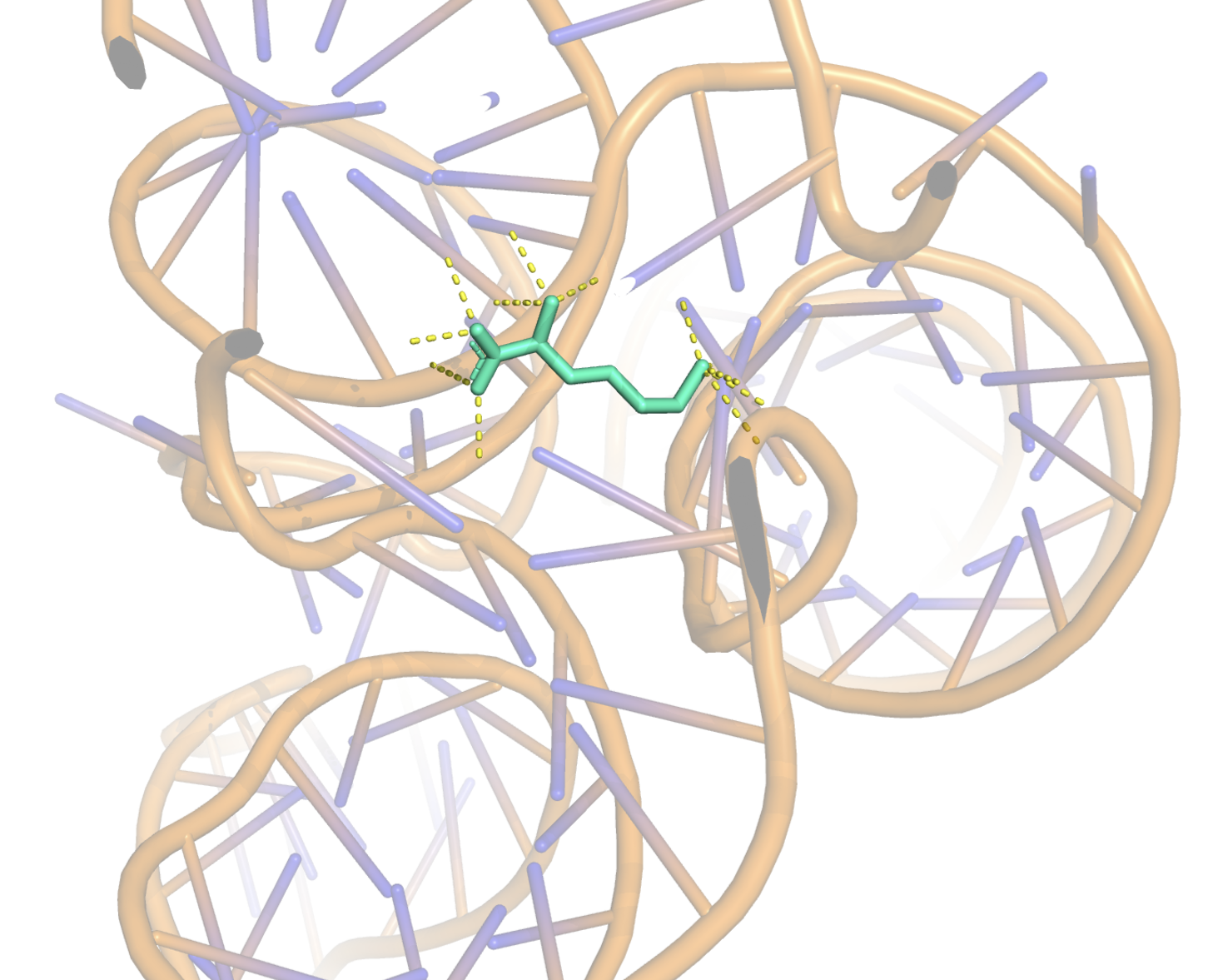
The binding pocket of L-lysine as depicted by the lysine attachment to the lysine riboswitch.

The Lysine riboswitch is a metabolite binding RNA element found within certain messenger RNAs that serve as a precision sensor for the amino acid lysine. Allosteric rearrangement of mRNA structure is mediated by ligand binding, and this results in modulation of gene expression. Lysine riboswitch are most abundant in Bacillota and Gammaproteobacteria where they are found upstream of a number of genes involved in lysine biosynthesis, transport and catabolism. The lysine riboswitch has also been identified independently and called the L box.

The lysine riboswitch controls metabolic pathways of lysine biosynthesis. In particular the metabolic flux of the tricarboxylic acid (TCA) cycle is effectively controlled by the riboswitch. Controlling metabolic flux is imperative for the development of microorganisms in cell growth, and the use of the lysine riboswitch in its applicable bacterium allows for the use of more effective strategies to accomplish control. It is more effective in comparison to various expensive and difficult methods such as utilizing a gene knockout. With lysine as an intracellular signal, the riboswitch regulates gene expression in response to specific metabolites. The lysine riboswitch was first investigated in Bacilus subtilis, located at the 5'UTR of the lysC gene coding for aspartokinase. It has since been found in E. coli (ECRS) with the ability to inhibit translation of aspartokinase III in E. coli and accelerate mRNA decay. In both E. coli and Bacilus subtilis, the lysine riboswitch controls the production of citrate synthase, and therefore metabolic flux in the TCA cycle as decreases in citrate synthase activity contributes to increases in lysine production. Control of TCA cycle activity thus affects the biosynthesis of lysine indicating a higher metabolic flux into the lysine synthesis pathway.It has no inhibitory effect on transcription except for in Bacilus subtilis. The ligand binding domain of the riboswitch binds to L Lysine.

== Structure ==
The structure of the lysine riboswitch has recently been determined. The lysine amino acid is bound in the pocket formed by the 5-way junction. The structure is composed of a three helical bundle and a two helical bundle joined by the 5-way junction. Helices 1 and 2 are stacked in a colinear fashion as are helices 4 and 5.

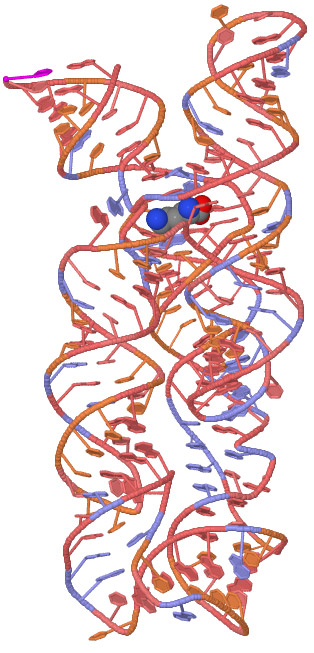
A 3D representation of the lysine riboswitch with a bound lysine molecule shown in space filling spheres.

== See also ==
- Glycine riboswitch
- Glutamine riboswitch
