= TPP riboswitch =

RNA secondary structure

TPP riboswitch (THI element)
- Predicted secondary structure and sequence conservation of TPP

Identifiers
- Symbol: TPP
- Alt. Symbols: THI
- Rfam: RF00059

Other data
- RNA type: Cis-reg; riboswitch
- Domain(s): Eukaryota; Bacteria; Archaea
- GO: GO:0030976
- SO: SO:0000035
- PDB structures: PDBe 4nyc

The TPP riboswitch, also known as the THI element and Thi-box riboswitch, is a highly conserved RNA secondary structure. It serves as a riboswitch that binds thiamine pyrophosphate (TPP) directly and modulates gene expression through a variety of mechanisms in archaea, bacteria and eukaryotes. TPP is the active form of thiamine (vitamin B_{1}), an essential coenzyme used by all kinds of life.

The THI element is an extension of a previously detected thiamin-regulatory element, the thi box, there is considerable variability in the predicted length and structures of the additional and facultative stem-loops represented in dark blue in the secondary structure diagram. The x-ray crystal structure of the TPP riboswitch aptamer has been solved.

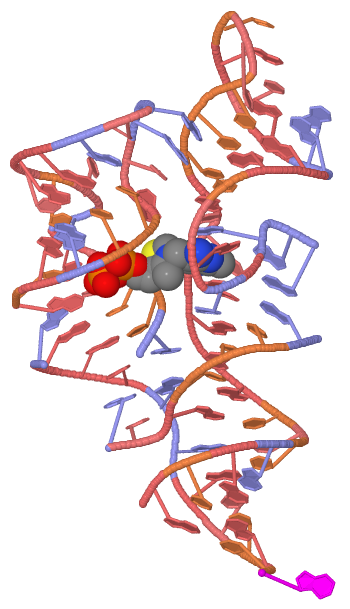
Experimental 3D structure of the TPP riboswitch (PDB: 2HOJ).

== Targets and mechanisms ==
The classical function of the TPP riboswitch is to control thiamine biosynthetic genes so that they are only translated when needed. This function is usually accompanied by the classical positioning of the riboswitch in the 5' UTR; when bound to TPP, the riboswitch causes aberrant splicing, making the mRNA fail to translate. Six groups of TPP riboswitches are known in fungi, the first two of perform this function.

Analysis of operon structures has identified a large number of new candidate thiamin-regulated genes, mostly transporters, in various bacteria. The four remaining groups of fungal TPP riboswitches control transporters.

== Ligands ==
Pyrithiamine (PT) is often used in the laboratory as a thiamine antagonist because it inhibits thiamine-related enzymes. PT pyrophosphate also binds to the TPP riboswitch and downregulates the target genes, making the inhibition harder to escape from. However, riboswitch resistance often occurs by mutations that abolish PT binding. PT is not used clinically as an antibiotic. In addition, the ESKAPE pathogens carry resistant riboswitches. (It is also possible that PT can directly bind the riboswitch, as it does not require thiamine kinase to work in E. coli like thiamine itself or other analogues.)

Nevertheless, there remains some hope in exploiting the TPP riboswitch as a way to disrupt the metabolism of pathogens: after all, it is not found in humans but found in most (if not all) of the pathogenic bacteria and fungi.

== See also ==
- Tetrahydrofolate riboswitch
- FMN riboswitch
