= Glycine riboswitch =

RNA element

Glycine
- Consensus secondary structure and sequence conservation of Glycine riboswitch

Identifiers
- Symbol: Glycine
- Rfam: RF00504

Other data
- RNA type: Cis-reg; Riboswitch
- GO: GO:0006545
- SO: SO:0000035
- PDB structures: PDBe

The bacterial glycine riboswitch is an RNA element that can bind the amino acid glycine. Glycine riboswitches usually consist of two metabolite-binding aptamer domains with similar structures in tandem. The aptamers were originally thought to cooperatively bind glycine to regulate the expression of downstream genes. In Bacillus subtilis, this riboswitch is found upstream of the gcvT operon which controls glycine degradation. It is thought that when glycine is in excess it will bind to both aptamers to activate these genes and facilitate glycine degradation.

The originally discovered, truncated version of the glycine riboswitch exhibits sigmoidal binding curves with Hill coefficients greater than one, which led to the idea of positive cooperativity between the two aptamer domains. Data in 2012 shows that cooperative binding does not occur in the switch with its extended 5' leader, though the purpose of the switch's dual aptamers is still uncertain.

Atomic resolution structures of portions of glycine riboswitches have been obtained by X-ray crystallography.

In vivo experiments demonstrated that glycine does not need to bind both aptamers for regulation. Mutation to the first aptamer caused greatest reduction in downstream gene expression, while mutation to the second one had varying effects. Glycine-induced expression of the gcvT operon is needed for B. subtilise growth, swarming motility and biofilm formation (in high glycine environment).

== See also ==
- Glutamine riboswitch
- Lysine riboswitch
