= Riboswitch =

Part of a messenger RNA molecule

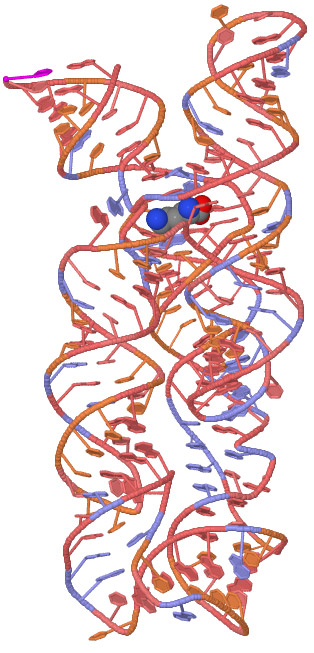
A 3D representation of the lysine riboswitch (PDB code:3DIL, orange and blue tubes) bound to lysine (shown as grey, red and blue spheres in the upper middle of the structure)

In molecular biology, a riboswitch is a regulatory segment of a messenger RNA molecule that binds a small molecule, resulting in a change in production of the proteins encoded by the mRNA. Thus, an mRNA that contains a riboswitch is directly involved in regulating its own activity, in response to the concentrations of its effector molecule. The discovery that modern organisms use RNA to bind small molecules, and discriminate against closely related analogs, expanded the known natural capabilities of RNA beyond its ability to code for proteins, catalyze reactions, or to bind other RNA or protein macromolecules.

The original definition of the term "riboswitch" specified that they directly sense small-molecule metabolite concentrations. Although this definition remains in common use, some biologists have used a broader definition that includes other cis-regulatory RNAs. However, this article will discuss only metabolite-binding riboswitches.

Most known riboswitches occur in bacteria, but functional riboswitches of one type (the TPP riboswitch) have been discovered in archaea, plants and certain fungi. TPP riboswitches have also been predicted in archaea, but have not been experimentally tested.

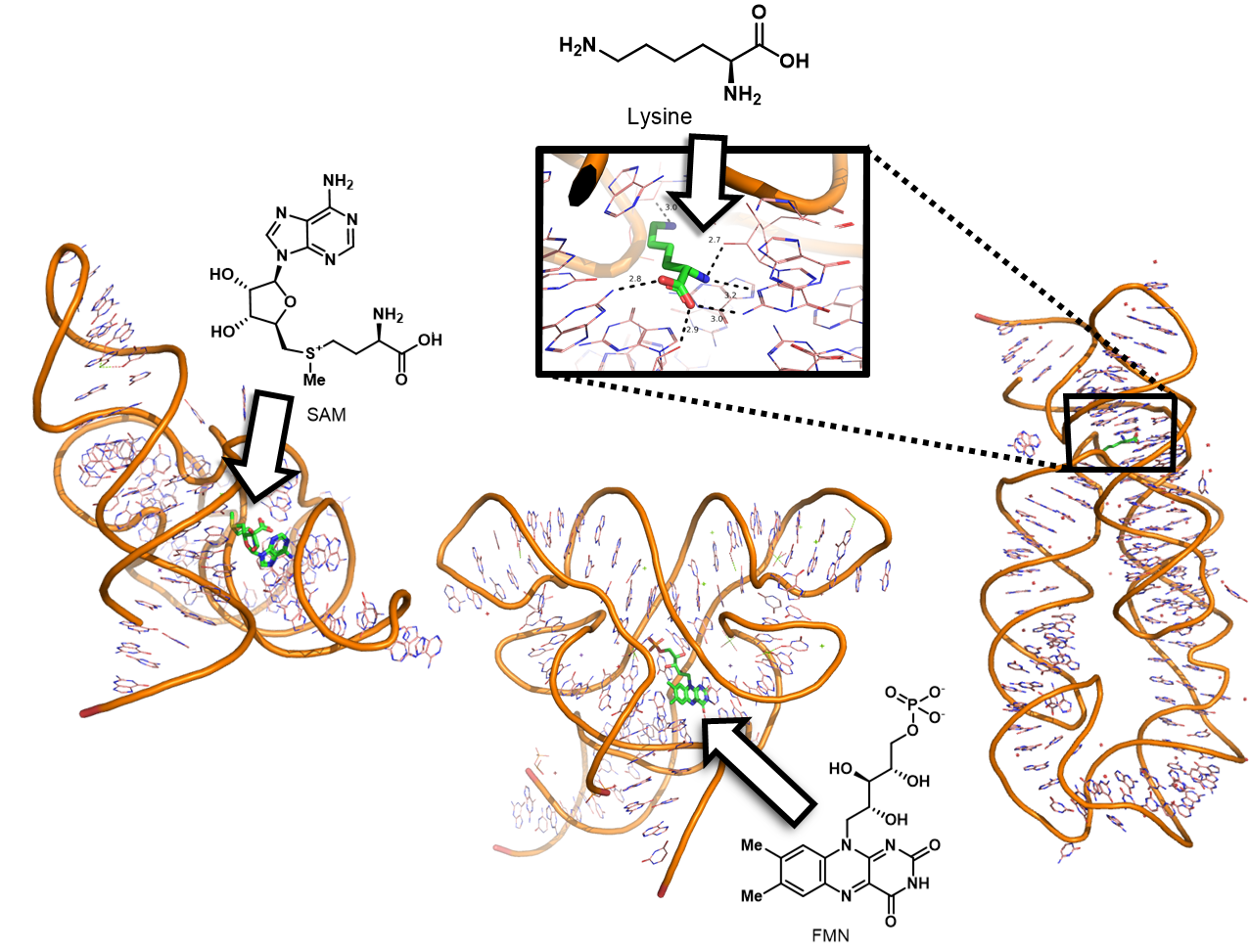
Examples of three riboswitches with their natural ligands. From left to right: the SAM riboswitch (PDB code: 3gx5), the FMN riboswitch (2yie) and the lysine riboswitch (PDB ID: 3d0u)

== History and discovery ==
Prior to the discovery of riboswitches, the mechanism by which some genes involved in multiple metabolic pathways were regulated remained mysterious. Accumulating evidence increasingly suggested the then-unprecedented idea that the mRNAs involved might bind metabolites directly, to affect their own regulation. These data included conserved RNA secondary structures often found in the untranslated regions (UTRs) of the relevant genes and the success of procedures to create artificial small molecule-binding RNAs called aptamers. In 2002, the first comprehensive proofs of multiple classes of riboswitches were published, including protein-free binding assays, and metabolite-binding riboswitches were established as a new mechanism of gene regulation.

Many of the earliest riboswitches to be discovered corresponded to conserved sequence "motifs" (patterns) in 5' UTRs that appeared to correspond to a structured RNA. For example, comparative analysis of upstream regions of several genes expected to be co-regulated led to the description of the S-box (now the SAM-I riboswitch), the THI-box (a region within the TPP riboswitch), the RFN element (now the FMN riboswitch) and the B_{12}-box (a part of the cobalamin riboswitch), and in some cases experimental demonstrations that they were involved in gene regulation via an unknown mechanism. Bioinformatics has played a role in more recent discoveries, with increasing automation of the basic comparative genomics strategy. Barrick et al. (2004) used BLAST to find UTRs homologous to all UTRs in Bacillus subtilis. Some of these homologous sets were inspected for conserved structure, resulting in 10 RNA-like motifs. Three of these were later experimentally confirmed as the glmS, glycine and PreQ1-I riboswitches (see below). Subsequent comparative genomics efforts using additional taxa of bacteria and improved computer algorithms have identified further riboswitches that are experimentally confirmed, as well as conserved RNA structures that are hypothesized to function as riboswitches.

== Mechanisms ==
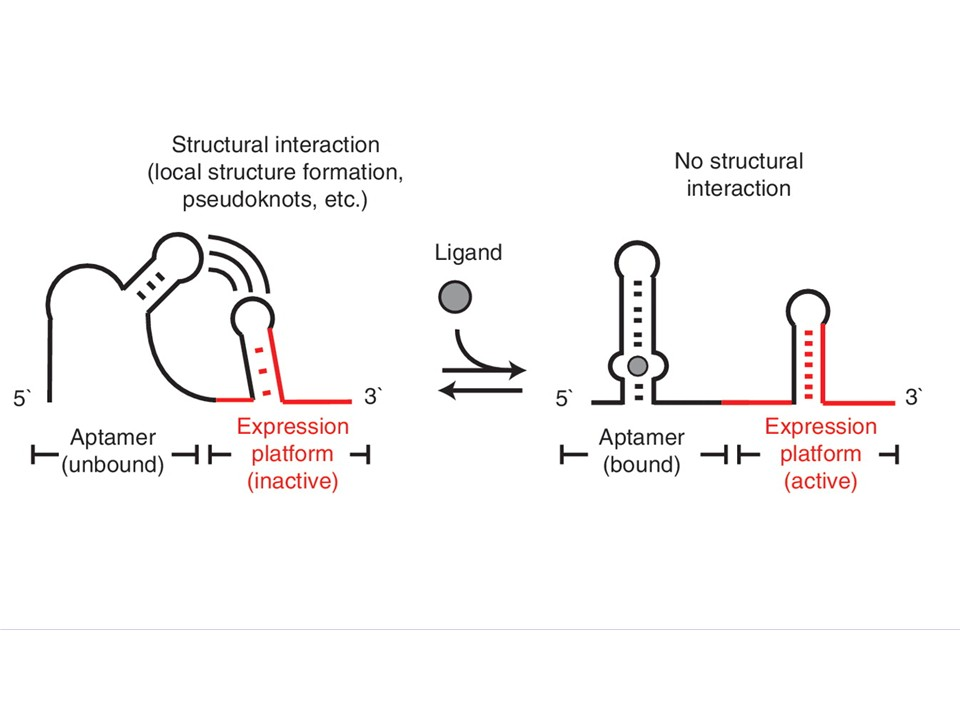
A riboswitch usually consists of an aptamer (black color) coupled to a structured expression platform (red color). When a ligand binds to the riboswitch, the expression platform becomes available for gene expression.

Riboswitches are often conceptually divided into two parts: an aptamer and an expression platform. The aptamer directly binds the small molecule, and the expression platform undergoes structural changes in response to the changes in the aptamer. The expression platform is what regulates gene expression.

Expression platforms typically turn off gene expression in response to the small molecule, but some turn it on. The following riboswitch mechanisms have been experimentally demonstrated.

- Riboswitch-controlled formation of rho-independent transcription termination hairpins leads to premature transcription termination.
- Riboswitch-mediated folding sequesters the ribosome-binding site, thereby inhibiting translation.
- The riboswitch is a ribozyme that cleaves itself in the presence of sufficient concentrations of its metabolite.
- Riboswitch alternate structures affect the splicing of the pre-mRNA.
  - A TPP riboswitch in Neurospora crassa (a fungus) controls alternative splicing to conditionally produce an Upstream Open Reading Frame (uORF), thereby affecting the expression of downstream genes
  - A TPP riboswitch in plants modifies splicing and alternative 3'-end processing
- A riboswitch in Clostridium acetobutylicum regulates an adjacent gene that is not part of the same mRNA transcript. In this regulation, the riboswitch interferes with transcription of the gene. The mechanism is uncertain but may be caused by clashes between two RNA polymerase units as they simultaneously transcribe the same DNA.
- A riboswitch in Listeria monocytogenes regulates the expression of its downstream gene. However, riboswitch transcripts subsequently modulate the expression of a gene located elsewhere in the genome. This trans regulation occurs via base-pairing to the mRNA of the distal gene. As the temperature of the bacterium increases, the riboswitch melts, allowing transcription. Unpublished undergraduate research created a similar riboswitch or 'thermosensor' via random mutagenesis of the Listeria monocytogenes sequence.

== Types ==
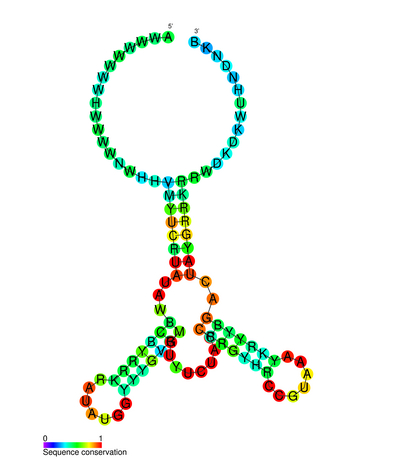
Secondary structure of a purine riboswitch from Bacillus subtilis

The following is a list of experimentally validated riboswitches, organized by ligand.

- Cobalamin riboswitch (also B_{12}-element), which binds either adenosylcobalamin (the coenzyme form of vitamin B_{12}) or aquocobalamin to regulate cobalamin biosynthesis and transport of cobalamin and similar metabolites, and other genes.
- cyclic AMP-GMP riboswitches bind the signaling molecule cyclic AMP-GMP. These riboswitches are structurally related to cyclic di-GMP-I riboswitches (see also "cyclic di-GMP" below).
- cyclic di-AMP riboswitches (also called ydaO/yuaA) bind the signaling molecule cyclic di-AMP.
- cyclic di-GMP riboswitches bind the signaling molecule cyclic di-GMP in order to regulate a variety of genes controlled by this second messenger. Two classes of cyclic di-GMP riboswitches are known: cyclic di-GMP-I riboswitches and cyclic di-GMP-II riboswitches. These classes do not appear to be structurally related.
- fluoride riboswitches sense fluoride ions, and function in surviving high levels of fluoride.
- FMN riboswitch (also RFN-element) binds flavin mononucleotide (FMN) to regulate riboflavin biosynthesis and transport.
- glmS riboswitch, which is a ribozyme that cleaves itself when there is a sufficient concentration of glucosamine-6-phosphate.
- Glutamine riboswitches bind glutamine to regulate genes involved in glutamine and nitrogen metabolism, as well as short peptides of unknown function. Two classes of glutamine riboswitches are known: the glnA RNA motif and Downstream-peptide motif. These classes are believed to be structurally related (see discussions in those articles).
- Glycine riboswitch binds glycine to regulate glycine metabolism genes, including the use of glycine as an energy source. Previous to 2012, this riboswitch was thought to be the only that exhibits cooperative binding, as it contains contiguous dual aptamers. Though no longer shown to be cooperative, the cause of dual aptamers still remains ambiguous.
- Lysine riboswitch (also L-box) binds lysine to regulate lysine biosynthesis, catabolism and transport.
- manganese riboswitches bind manganese ions.
- NiCo riboswitches bind the metal ions nickel and cobalt.
- PreQ1 riboswitches bind pre-queuosine_{1}, to regulate genes involved in the synthesis or transport of this precursor to queuosine. Three entirely distinct classes of PreQ1 riboswitches are known: PreQ1-I riboswitches, PreQ1-II riboswitches and PreQ1-III riboswitches. The binding domain of PreQ1-I riboswitches are unusually small among naturally occurring riboswitches. PreQ1-II riboswitches, which are only found in certain species in the genera Streptococcus and Lactococcus, have a completely different structure, and are larger, as are PreQ1-III riboswitches.
- Purine riboswitches binds purines to regulate purine metabolism and transport. Different forms of the purine riboswitch bind guanine (a form originally known as the G-box) or adenine. The specificity for either guanine or adenine depends completely upon Watson-Crick interactions with a single pyrimidine in the riboswitch at position Y74. In the guanine riboswitch this residue is always a cytosine (i.e. C74), in the adenine residue it is always a uracil (i.e. U74). Homologous types of purine riboswitches bind deoxyguanosine, but have more significant differences than a single nucleotide mutation.
- SAH riboswitches bind S-adenosylhomocysteine to regulate genes involved in recycling this metabolite that is produced when S-adenosylmethionine is used in methylation reactions.
- SAM riboswitches bind S-adenosyl methionine (SAM) to regulate methionine and SAM biosynthesis and transport. Three distinct SAM riboswitches are known: SAM-I (originally called S-box), SAM-II and the S_{MK} box riboswitch. SAM-I is widespread in bacteria, but SAM-II is found only in Alpha-, Beta-, and a few Gammaproteobacteria. The S_{MK} box riboswitch is found only in the order Lactobacillales. These three varieties of riboswitch have no obvious similarities in terms of sequence or structure. A fourth variety, SAM-IV riboswitches, appears to have a similar ligand-binding core to that of SAM-I riboswitches, but in the context of a distinct scaffold.
- SAM-SAH riboswitches bind both SAM and SAH with similar affinities. Since they are always found in a position to regulate genes encoding methionine adenosyltransferase, it was proposed that only their binding to SAM is physiologically relevant.
- Tetrahydrofolate riboswitches bind tetrahydrofolate to regulate synthesis and transport genes.
- TPP riboswitches (also THI-box) binds thiamin pyrophosphate (TPP) to regulate thiamin biosynthesis and transport, as well as transport of similar metabolites. It is the only riboswitch found so far in eukaryotes.
- ZMP/ZTP riboswitches sense ZMP and ZTP, which are by-products of de novo purine metabolism when levels of 10-Formyltetrahydrofolate are low.

Presumed riboswitches:

- Moco RNA motif is presumed to bind molybdenum cofactor, to regulate genes involved in biosynthesis and transport of this coenzyme, as well as enzymes that use it or its derivatives as a cofactor.

Candidate metabolite-binding riboswitches have been identified using bioinformatics, and have moderately complex secondary structures and several highly conserved nucleotide positions, as these features are typical of riboswitches that must specifically bind a small molecule. Riboswitch candidates are also consistently located in the 5' UTRs of protein-coding genes, and these genes are suggestive of metabolite binding, as these are also features of most known riboswitches. Hypothesized riboswitch candidates highly consistent with the preceding criteria are as follows: crcB RNA Motif, manA RNA motif, pfl RNA motif, ydaO/yuaA leader, yjdF RNA motif, ykkC-yxkD leader (and related ykkC-III RNA motif) and the yybP-ykoY leader. The functions of these hypothetical riboswitches remain unknown.

== Computational models ==
Riboswitches have been also investigated using in-silico approaches. In particular, solutions for riboswitch prediction can be divided into two wide categories:

- riboswitch gene finders, i.e. systems aimed at uncovering riboswitches by genomic inspections, mostly based on motif-searching mechanisms. This group contains Infernal, the founding component of the Rfam database, and more specific tools such as RibEx or RiboSW.
- conformational switch predictors, i.e., methods based on a structural classification of alternative structures, such as paRNAss, RNAshapes and RNAbor. Moreover, family-specific approaches for ON/OFF structure prediction have been proposed as well.

The SwiSpot tool somehow covers both the groups, as it uses conformational predictions to assess the presence of riboswitches.

Other computational investigations look into the druggability properties of riboswitch binding sites, assessing their potency as potential novel drug targets. Additionally, generative models such as restricted Boltzmann machines have been applied to learn sequence dependencies and design de novo functional RNA riboswitches.

== The RNA world hypothesis ==
Riboswitches demonstrate that naturally occurring RNA can bind small molecules specifically, a capability that many previously believed was the domain of proteins or artificially constructed RNAs called aptamers. The existence of riboswitches in all domains of life therefore adds some support to the RNA world hypothesis, which holds that life originally existed using only RNA, and proteins came later; this hypothesis requires that all critical functions performed by proteins (including small molecule binding) could be performed by RNA. It has been suggested that some riboswitches might represent ancient regulatory systems, or even remnants of RNA-world ribozymes whose bindings domains are conserved.

== As antibiotic targets ==
RNA is already an emerging drug target. Multiple factors contribute to riboswitches as targets for novel antibiotics:

- Their ability to bind small molecules with high affinity combined make them suitable for drug targeting
- Some riboswitches contain binding sites that display promising characteristics regarding druggability.
- The absence of riboswitches in eukaryotic cells enables them to be highly specific targets for novel antibiotics
- Inhibition of some riboswitches have been proven to be effective in leading to bacterial cell death.

Indeed, some antibiotics whose mechanism of action was unknown for decades have been shown to operate by targeting riboswitches. For example, when the antibiotic pyrithiamine enters the cell, it is metabolized into pyrithiamine pyrophosphate. Pyrithiamine pyrophosphate has been shown to bind and activate the TPP riboswitch, causing the cell to cease the synthesis and import of TPP. Because pyrithiamine pyrophosphate does not substitute for TPP as a coenzyme, the cell dies.

== Engineered riboswitches ==
Since riboswitches are an effective method of controlling gene expression in natural organisms, there has been interest in engineering artificial riboswitches for industrial and medical applications such as gene therapy.

== See also ==
- RNA thermometer - Another class of mRNA regulatory segments which change conformation in response to temperature fluctuations, thereby exposing or occluding the ribosome binding site.
- Aptamer – Oligonucleotide or peptide molecules that bind specific targets
