= Epigenetics of human development =

DNA changes that regulate human traits

Epigenetics play an important role in animal development, including the development of human beings. Various epigenetic markers serve different roles that facilitate the growth of human organisms.

== Hox gene regulation ==
Hox genes are genes in humans that regulate body plan development. Humans have four sets of Hox genes, numbering 39 genes altogether, all of which aid in the differentiation of cells by location. Hox genes are activated early in the development of the embryo, in order to plan the development of the differing structures of the body. They also show colinearity with the body plan, meaning that the order of the Hox genes is similar to the expression levels of the Hox genes on the anterior-posterior axis. This colinearity allows for a spatial and temporal activation of genes in order to produce a proper body structure.

In Hox genes, long non-coding RNAs allow for communication between different Hox genes and different sets of Hox genes in order to coordinate body plan in the cell. One example of a long non-coding RNA that coordinates between Hox gene sets is HOTAIR, which is an RNA transcript produced in the HoxC cassette that represses transcription of a large number of genes in the HoxD cassette. Thus, HOTAIR regulates the HoxD genes from the HoxC genes in order to coordinate transcription of the Hox genes.

=== Role of PcG and TrxG ===
The PcG and TrxG genes that produce protein complexes responsible for continuing the activation and the repression patterns in the Hox genes initially formed by the maternal factors. PcG genes are responsible for repressing chromatin in Hox clusters meant to be inactivated in the differentiated cell. PcG proteins repress genes by forming polycomb repressive complexes, such as PRC1 and PRC2. PRC2 complexes repress by trimethylating histone 3 at lysine 27 through histone methyltransferases Ezh2 and Ezh1. PRC2 is recruited by many elements, including CpG islands. PRC1, meanwhile, ubiquitinates H2AK119 using Ring1A/B's E3 ligase activity, causing stalling of RNA polymerase II. Furthermore, Ring1B, a member of the PRC1 complex, also represses Hox genes with Me118, Mph2, and RYBP by compacting the chromatin into higher-order structures. TrxG genes, meanwhile, are responsible for activating genes by trimethylating lysine 4 of the histone H3 tail. Genes with similar transcriptional marks tend to cluster together in distinct structures. In bivalent domains, both of these marks are present, indicating genes that are silenced but can be rapidly activated when necessary.

=== Role of ncRNAs ===
231 ncRNAs are present in the four Hox gene cassettes. Similarly to the Hox protein-coding genes, the ncRNAs show differential expression according to the cell's location on the anterior-posterior and proximal-distal axes. These lncRNAs can act either on the set of genes which they are present in, or can act on a separate gene set within the Hox genes.

HOTTIP is a long non-coding RNA that assists in regulating the HoxA genes. It is produced from the 5' end of the HoxA gene cassette, and activates HoxA genes. Loops within the chromosome bring HOTTIP closer to its targets; this allows HOTTIP to bind to WDR5/MLL protein complexes to aid in trimethylation of lysine 4 of histone 3.

HOTAIR is a long non-coding RNA that assists in regulating the HoxD genes. It is produced in the HoxC cassette, near the divide between expressed and unexpressed genes, and represses HoxD genes. HOTAIR acts by attaching to Suz12 in the PRC2 complex, and then guides this complex to the genes to be repressed. PRC2 then trimethylates the lysine 27 of histone 3, repressing the gene of interest.

== Barr body formation ==
In female humans, Barr bodies are defined as the condensed and inactivated X-chromosome that is found in every cell of the adult. Because females have two nearly identical X chromosomes, one of them must be silenced so that the expression levels of the genes on the X-chromosome are of the proper dosage. Thus, males and females have the same level of X-chromosome expression, despite being born with one X for males and two for females. This is also why individuals with Klinefelter syndrome, a disease in which more than two sex chromosomes are present in the body, have fewer symptoms than individuals with other types of aneuploidy, which are often fatal before birth.

=== Role of Xist ===
Inactivation of one of the X chromosomes is initiated by a long non coding RNA called Xist. This lncRNA is expressed on the same chromosome it represses, known as working in cis. Recent research has shown that a repeat element in the RNA of Xist causes PRC2 to bind to the RNA. Another part of the RNA binds to the X-chromosome positioning PRC2 such that it can methylate various regions on the X-chromosome. This methylation causes other factors like histone deacetylases (HDACs) to bind to the chromosome and propagate heterochromatin formation, even into active gene regions. This heterochromatin greatly reduces, if not completely silences gene expression of the Barr body. Xist will be continuously created to maintain a condensed and silenced Barr body.

In human cells with more than one X chromosome, two long non-coding RNAs are produced: Tsix is produced by one X chromosome, and Xist is produced by all of the other X chromosomes. Tsix is a long non-coding RNA that prevents repression of an X chromosome, while Xist is a long non-coding RNA that acts to repress and condense an entire X chromosome. The actions of Xist serve to create a Barr body in the cell.

== Imprinting ==
Imprinting is defined as the differential expression of paternal and maternal alleles of a gene, due to epigenetic marks introduced onto the chromosome during the production of egg and sperm. These marks usually lead to differential expression of the specific sets of genes from the maternal and paternal chromosomes. Imprinting is carried out through many epigenetic mechanisms like methylation, histone modifications, rearrangement of higher order chromatin structure, non-coding RNAs, and interfering RNAs.

=== Function ===
A single evolutionary purpose of imprinting is still unknown, since the mechanisms and effects seem to be so diverse. One hypothesis states that imprinting occurs in order to carry out the evolutionary goal of the parent, that being the differential partition of resources. The male seeks to provide maximum resources for his offspring so that his genes may be passed on successfully to the next generation, whereas the female must partition resources between all her offspring, and so must limit resources given.

Another hypothesis states that imprinting may help protect the female from ovarian trophoblastic disease and parthenogenesis. Trophoblastic disease occurs when a sperm fertilizes an egg with no nucleus and a cancer-like mass forms in the placenta. Parthenogenesis occurs when an unfertilized egg develops into a fully functional organism that is genetically identical to the parent, who is female in the case of animals or both sexes, in the case of plants.

=== Igf2 and H19 ===
In mammals, imprinted genes are often clustered in the genome, probably because they share transcriptional regulators or regulatory regions that impact the expression of multiple genes. It is easier for a lncRNA to silence multiple genes if they are closer together, making silencing more efficient. In some cases, when a gene is transcribed it overlaps another region nearby or opposite (antisense) to it, often silencing it. In the case of the Ifg2 and H19 genes, CTCF, a transcriptional repressor protein, is involved. CTCF binds to the unmethylated maternal ICR region but not the methylated paternal ICR region. ICR is a shared control region of Ifg2 and H19 that, when deleted, results in the loss of imprinting of these genes. CTCF then binds another region of the chromosome, creating a loop where Igf2 is blocked from transcription, but H19 is not, resulting in the maternal chromosome expressing H19 but not Igf2. CTCF has been shown to directly interact with Suz12, a subunit of PRC2, in order to silence the Ifg2 promoter region through hypermethylation. Conversely, the paternal H19 promoter is highly methylated during embryogenesis so that Ifg2 will not be silenced. Should CTCF fail to bind, H19 on the maternal chromosome has reduced expression and Igf2 is not silenced properly, resulting in biallelic expression. Mice have homologues of these genes, but silence them in a different way, where biallelic expression occurs and then antisense RNA is used to silence one of the genes.

=== Igf2r and Airn ===
Airn is an lncRNA used to silence Igf2r and other surrounding genes. In the mechanism to silence Igf2r, the transcription of the lncRNA Airn silences the expression of Igf2r, as opposed to an active repression mechanism. Airn is the antisense gene of Ifg2r, so if Airn is being transcribed, the transcriptional machinery may cover a part of or the entire promoter region of Igf2r, so RNA polymerase cannot bind to the promoter region of Igf2r in order to initiate transcription. This mechanism is very efficient in that Igf2r is silenced by transcription of Airn, while the RNA product silences other genes near Igf2r. The imprinting mechanisms described above work on the chromosome that the Airn lncRNA is produced, but there are many other imprinted genes that work to silence genes on other chromosomes or to silence the similar allele(s) on the opposing chromosome of the same pair. Some imprinted genes code for regulatory RNA elements such as lncRNA, small nucleolar RNA, and micro RNA, so the expression of these genes results in the silencing of some other gene.

From these examples, researchers have seen similar patterns in developmental genetics. It is imperative that many genes are silenced at the right time so that cells can maintain their identity and expressional integrity. Failure to do so often leads to symptoms such as cognitive abnormalities, if not fatality.

=== Igf2r regulation ===
The lncRNA Airn is an lncRNA that regulates Igf2r expression. Igf2r is a gene which expresses a receptor for insulin-like growth factor 2, and assists in lysosomal enzyme transport, activation of growth factors, and degradation of insulin-like growth factor 2. This lncRNA is an RNA modified by imprinting, leading to Airn expression in the paternal allele, but not in the maternal allele. Airn acts by cis-acting silencing of the Igf2r region through overlapping the Igf2r gene through the antisense transcript encoded by Airn. Airn is silenced in the maternal allele through Igf2r transcription. In the brain, however, Igf2r alleles are both expressed due to Airn mediation being repressed in neuronal cells.

== Role of PRC2 ==
PRC2 (Polycomb repressive complex 2) is a complex of proteins that repress chromatin by histone methylation and by working to recruit other proteins that help further the repression of chromatin. The structure of this complex and group of mechanisms used by this complex are highly conserved across various eukaryotic species. Very few species have duplicates of these complexes in the genome beyond PRC1 and PRC2.

== Role of lncRNAs ==
Long non-coding RNAs, or lncRNAs, are RNA transcripts produced by RNA polymerase II that are not translated but participate in the regulation of gene expression. Long non-coding RNAs are used in various epigenetic processes in development, including the regulation of Hox genes, as well as in the creation of Barr bodies.

=== Repressive function ===
PRC2 is a multi-protein complex composed of four major subunits (E2H1/2, SUZ12, EED, and RbAp46/48) and three variable subunits (AEBP2, JARID2, and PCLs). The three variable subunits are used for catalysis of enzymatic reactions or binding to specific regions, not for repression of genes or chromatin. Similar to a zinc finger, AEBP2 docks onto the major grooves of DNA to assist in binding. PRC2 is usually recruited by other proteins or lncRNa and then catalyzes the trimethylation of lysine 27 of histone 3 tails (H3K27me3). This methylation is thought to cause repression by steric hindrance of RNA polymerase II. Even though the polymerase is not prevented from binding, the polymerase, after beginning transcription, will pause at H3K27me3 marks. The short transcript produced by the pausing of the polymerase often recruits regulatory complexes, like PRC2. Thus, PRC2 represses by two mechanisms: by directly altering the structure of the chromatin through methylation or by binding of transcripts.

=== Phosphorylation ===
PRC2 has been shown in many experiments to be necessary for the proper formation of organs, starting with the maintenance of cellular differentiation and silencing of pluripotency genes. The exact mechanism in early embryogenesis that induces cells to differentiate is still unclear, but this mechanism has been closely linked to protein kinase A (PKA). Since the PRC2 complex has sites able to be phosphorylated and has differentiated behavior based on the level of phosphorylation, a logical hypothesis can be made that PKA affects PRC2 behavior and may phosphorylate PRC2, activating the protein and starting the methylation cascade that silences genes.

=== Early cell differentiation ===
Experimentally, PRC2 has been shown to be highly enriched at the Hox genes and near developmental gene regulators, resulting in their methylation. Some time after the second or third cleavage event, PRC2 begins to bind to these developmental genes, even though they have the markers for highly active genes like H3K9me3. This has been described as the "leaking" of PRC2 binding. Variable binding will cause some genes to be silenced before others, causing differentiation, but this is likely regulated by the organism. What causes the specificity of cell differentiation is still unknown but some hypotheses say it largely has to do with the cell environment and the "awareness" of the cells to each other, considering all cells in this stage contain identical genomes at this point. The maintained cell lines after this differentiation event are largely dependent on PRC2. Without it, pluripotency genes will still be active, causing the cells to be unstable and reversion back to a stem cell-like stage where the cell would have to undergo differentiation again in order to return to its normal state. Properly differentiated cells have silenced pluripotency genes.

=== Maintenance of chromosome condensation ===
PRC2 is also highly associated with intergenic regions, subtelomeric regions, and long-terminal repeat transposons. PRC2 acts to create heterochromatin in these regions through similar mechanisms to the mechanism used to repress genes. Heterochromatin formation is imperative in these regions in order to regulate gene expression, maintain chromatin shape, prevent degradation of the chromosome, and reduce the event of transposon "hopping" or spontaneous recombination.

Thus, PRC2 is not only essential to the initiation of differentiation in development, but also for maintaining heterochromatin in all cell stages and for silencing genes and chromosome regions that would undo the cell differentiation that had already occurred or negatively affect the survival of the cell or the organism as a whole.

=== Paraspeckle formation ===
Neat1 is an lncRNA which assists in forming the structure of nuclear structures known as paraspeckles: nuclear bodies which contain RNA-binding proteins. They control gene expression in the nucleus by retaining RNA in the nucleus that would otherwise alter gene expression. Paraspeckles form a significant portion of the corpus luteum of the ovary; in Neat1 impaired mice, corpus luteum formation is highly dysfunctional, causing ovarian defects and lowered progesterone levels resulting in a lack of pregnancy in Neat1 deficient mice. Neat1 assists in regulation of luteal genes by preventing the protein Sfpq from inhibiting Nr5a1 and Sp1, allowing luteal genes to be regularly transcribed. Neat1 is regulated by histone deacetylases.

=== Neuronal differentiation ===
Evf2 is a lncRNA that acts in forebrain neuronal differentiation during embryonic development. Evf2 is transcribed from an ultraconserved region, or a region that is very highly conserved among most vertebrate species, within the region from Dlx5 to Dlx6. This region is a target for SHH, a highly important regulator of central nervous system development. Evf2, when transcribed, recruits Dlx and Mecp2 through cis and trans-acting mechanisms to the Dlx5/6 region in the ventral forebrain, causing GABAergic interneurons in the hippocampus to be formed. Evf2 acts by forming a complex with Dlx4 that increases Dlx4 transcription activation ability and stability.

Malat1, another neurological lncRNA, causes increased synaptic function and greater amounts of dendrite development. Increases of Malat1 increase neuronal density, while decreases of Malat1 decrease neuronal density. Malat1 acts by regulating the expression levels of Nlgn1 and SynCAM1 which are important genes in synapse formation.

== Role of BRD4 ==
Bromodomain protein 4, or BRD4, is a protein which binds to acetylated tails of histones H3 and H4 to aid active gene transcription by decompaction using the bromodomain with the assistance of the acetylated K5 on H4. BRD4 is a member of the BET protein family, which includes other bromodomain-containing proteins and their homologues in other species. BRD4 is a protein which functions in both gene activation and repression in cell cycle control and DNA replication. BRD4 functions by binding to the acetylated tails and then attaching to other proteins, allowing those proteins to either activate or repress the histones next to BRD4.

BRD4 aids in early cell development by activating pluripotent genes through interacting with Oct4 and recruiting P-TEFb (positive transcription elongation factor). By occupying pluripotent genes and X-chromosome inactivation lncRNAs in their regulatory regions, BRD4 enhances activation of these DNA regions. BRD4 enhances this activation by recruiting P-TEFb; if either BRD4 or P-TEFb is not functional, pluripotent gene transcription is blocked, and the cell differentiates into a neuroectodermal cell.

BRD4 can act as epigenetic bookmarking throughout the cell cycle, including after transcription, due to its association with P-TEFb, allowing BRD4 to enhance RNAPII.

BRD4 also assists in the hyperacetylation of histones in the sperm nucleus. Histone hyperacetylation, the addition of acetyl groups to lysines on the amino tails of histones in an amount much larger than normal, is believed to assist in histone removal from the sperm nucleus.

== Developmental diseases ==
Examples of diseases caused by epigenetic dysfunction in development include:

- Beckwith–Wiedemann syndrome, caused by abnormal methylation in the maternal ICE region, causing Igf2 overexpression. Symptoms include accelerated growth, abnormal growth (hemihyperplasia), abdominal wall defects, macroglossia, hypoglycemia, kidney abnormalities, and large abdominal organs.
- Russell–Silver syndrome, caused by abnormal lack of methylation in the paternal ICE region, causing Igf2 repression. Symptoms include low birth weight, failure to thrive, hypoglycemia, distinctive head shape, abnormal growth, clinodactyly, and digestive issues.
- Prader–Willi syndrome, caused by missing paternal expression of the region which UBE3A expression inhibits. Symptoms include hypotonia, feeding difficulties, delayed development, poor growth, hyperphagia, obesity, learning disabilities, intellectual impairment, delayed or incomplete puberty, behavioral issues, sleep abnormalities, and distinctive features.
- Angelman syndrome, caused by loss of UBE3A expression in the maternal allele. Symptoms include delayed development, intellectual disability, ataxia, speech impairment, epilepsy, microcephaly, hyperactivity, excitable demeanor, scoliosis, and difficulty sleeping.
- Alpha thalassemia X-linked syndrome, which can be caused by hypomethylation in certain repeat sequences. Symptoms include delayed development, hypotonia, distinctive facial features, and reduced hemoglobin production.
- ICF syndrome, caused by a mutation in the DNA methyltransferase 3b gene or DNA hypomethylation, which causes lack of DNA methylation. Symptoms include intellectual impairment and alpha thalassemia.
- Cancerous stem cells, caused by misregulation of polycomb proteins that often lead to blocking or activating developmental genes at the wrong time. Tumor suppressor genes may be silenced and undifferentiated cells proliferate an increased rate.
- There are many diseases that have been closely linked to Hox gene malfunctions, caused by genetic and epigenetic factors such as sequence mutations, overexpression, underexpression, and others. These diseases often involve missing or extra body parts like extra fingers, missing bones, missing auditory organs, limb deformations, etc. Some Hox gene defects have even been shown to cause early cancers. A full list of which genes cause which diseases can be seen in the reference "Human Hox gene disorders" by Quinonez.
