= Hoxa =

Hoxa may refer to:

- Hoxa, one of the four clusters in which Hox genes are arranged in higher vertebrates, or one of the following genes associated with it:
  - HOXA9
  - HOXA11
  - HOXA11-AS1 (gene)
  - HOXA13
- HOXA, the Hazaribagh Old Xaverians Association, the official alumni organization for St. Xavier's School in Hazaribagh, Jharkhand, India
- Hoxa, Orkney, settlement on South Ronaldsay in the Orkney Islands

== See also ==
- Enver Hoxha (1908-1985), Communist leader of Albania from 1944 to 1985
