= HOXA11-AS1 =

Long non-coding RNA from the antisense strand in homeobox A

HOXA11-AS

Identifiers
- Aliases: HOXA11-AS, HOXA-AS5, HOXA11-AS1, HOXA11S, NCRNA00076, HOXA11 antisense RNA
- External IDs: OMIM: 607530; GeneCards: HOXA11-AS

Gene location (Human)
| Chr. | Chromosome 7 (human) |
| Band | 7p15.2 | Start | 27,184,507 bp |
| Band | 7p15.2 | End | 27,189,298 bp |
RNA expression pattern
| Bgee | Human / Mouse (ortholog); Top expressed in: mucosa of transverse colon; prostate; muscle layer of sigmoid colon; canal of the cervix; ectocervix; rectum; body of uterus; stromal cell of endometrium; myometrium; smooth muscle tissue / n/a; More reference expression data |
| BioGPS | n/a |
Orthologs
| Databases | NCBI: entry; OMA: entry |
| Species | Human | Mouse |
| Entrez | 221883 | n/a |
| Ensembl | ENSG00000240990 | n/a |
| UniProt | n a | n/a |
| RefSeq (mRNA) | n/a | n/a |
| RefSeq (protein) | n/a | n/a |
| Location (UCSC) | Chr 7: 27.18 – 27.19 Mb | n/a |
| PubMed search | | n/a |
- Wikidata
| View/Edit Human |

HOXA11-AS lncRNA is a long non-coding RNA from the antisense strand in the homeobox A (HOXA gene). The HOX gene contains four clusters (A, B, C, and D). The sense strand of the HOXA gene codes for proteins. Alternative names for HOXA11-AS lncRNA are: HOXA-AS5, HOXA11S, HOXA11-AS1, HOXA11AS, or NCRNA00076. This gene is 3,885 nucleotides long and resides at chromosome 7 (7p15.2) and is transcribed from an independent gene promoter. Being a lncRNA, it is longer than 200 nucleotides in length, in contrast to regular non-coding RNAs.

The HOX genes code for transcription factors that are key to embryonic development. This lncRNA is one of the three lncRNAs present in the 5-prime region of the HOXA11 gene. The other two lncRNAs are HOXA10-AS and HOTTIP. Of these lncRNAs, HOXA11-AS, is the most conserved sequence in a wide range of organisms, which shows its longevity in the phylogenetic tree. Since HOX genes play a prominent role in embryogenesis and carcinogenesis, genes on the sense strand and antisense non-coding RNA (ncRNA) genes are often studied in their role of aberrant epithelial differentiation and cancer development.

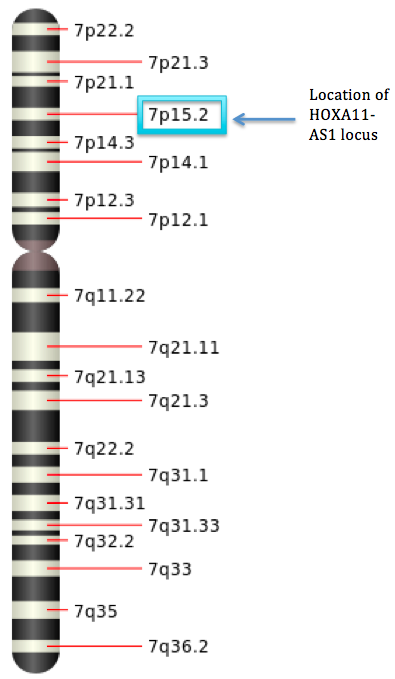
Location of HOXA11AS1 locus on chromosome 7

== Function ==
Many lncRNAs are sequences that regulate the expression of nearby or distant genes. Common in HOX genes, lncRNAs can either regulate through cis or trans mechanisms, respectively. Cis mechanisms are transcription based when nearby genes are regulated, whereas trans mechanisms are transcript-based and regulate genes afar. HOXA11-AS regulates transcription factors and is a co-activator of the HOXA gene and other genes. Coming from HOXA homeobox, HOXA11-AS lncRNA regulates HOXA11 mRNA by blocking transcription.

HOXA11-AS is similar to other lncRNAs in that it can affect many genes at once, thus allowing both local and genome-wide control. It is also similar because of its function in regulating cell proliferation, cell cycle, migration, apoptosis, and promoting angiogenesis. Some studies have shown that overexpression causes aberrant functions of the mechanisms listed above; however, other studies have shown downregulation is the cause.

== Mechanism ==
Not much is known about the exact mechanism of HOXA11-AS lncRNA. Studies of Drosophila however show that many intergenic regions in the HOX genes code for lncRNAs that regulate the transcription of genes. Similar to other lncRNAs, HOXA11-AS lncRNA has epigenetic control over the transcription of genes. Typically found in the nucleus of cells, HOXA11-AS lncRNA regulates the recruitment of transcription factors, and thus plays a role in chromatin remodeling. As with most lncRNAS, HOXA11-AS lncRNA is attached to the site of transcription through the Polymerase II ternary complex, which allows for allele specific action. This feature is not seen in proteins or small nuclear RNAs. LncRNAs are concentrated in the nucleus because these sequences, contained in the intron sequences, are removed from the final mRNA transcript in mRNA processing. Sequences that are not removed make up the mRNA and are capped, polyadenylated, and exported out of the nucleus.

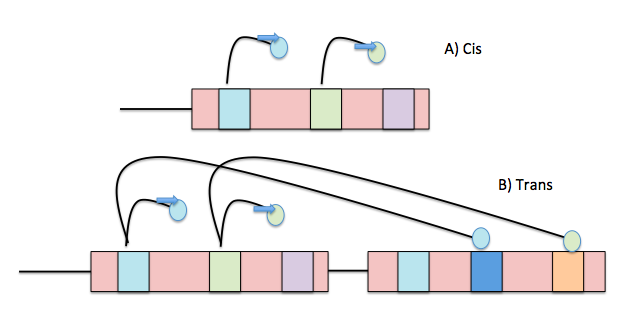
Above: Cis regulation of nearby genes Below: Trans regulation of distant genes

Epigenetic proteins that are involved with lncRNAs are categorized as either: writers, readers, or erasers. These proteins either add epigenetic modifications, recognize epigenetic changes, or remove epigenetic modifications, respectively. LncRNAs are able to complementarily hybridize to DNA sequences in the genome, thus targeting sequences and localizing epigenetic changes. Oftentimes, lncRNAs are not free-floating in the nucleus and are attached to chromosomes.

Studies regarding HOX genes have found that lncRNAs are highly expressed in relation to the homeobox genes. Known antisense HOX lncRNAs, such as HOTAIR, are scaffolds where transcription factors bind, which makes them mediators of epigenetic regulation. Furthermore, this and other HOX lncRNAs are required for the normal development of the organism and are overexpressed in different forms of cancer. The overexpression of HOX lncRNA promotes cancer because it causes epigenetic regulator proteins to relocate and the chromatin of the cell to be remodeled. This remodeling can cause highly regulated functions of the cell, like proliferation, migration, and apoptosis to become unrestrained. Given the sparse research on the specific mechanism of HOXA11-AS lncRNA and what is known about the role of HOX genes, it may hold that HOXA11-AS lncRNAs act in a similar manner to other HOX lncRNAs.

== Cancer ==
HOXA11-AS has been reported to have roles in various different cancers, including breast cancer, lung cancer, ovarian cancer, gastric cancer, colorectal cancer, glioma, and cervical cancer. Some studies have indicated that lncRNAs can be markers or targeted for treatment in various types of cancers.

=== Breast ===
Tissue samples of patients with breast cancer show high expression levels of HOXA11-AS, indicating its carcinogenic nature. Evidence of over-expression of HOXA11-AS as a causative factor of cell proliferation is seen when proliferation is blocked, once the lncRNA expression is knocked-down, or removed. Manipulating or removing the expression of this lncRNA allowed scientists to halt the progression of the cell cycle and initiate cell apoptosis at common cellular checkpoints, such as G1/G0 stage. The expression of the lnRNA was also suppressed by using small interfering RNAs (siRNA), that would degrade HOXA11-AS lnRNA transcripts. Upon doing so, cell proliferation was blocked. In addition to interfering with proliferation, degradation of HOXA11-AS lncRNA with siRNA was also seen to influence cell migration and cell tumor invasion, which is cancer metastasis. Scientists were able to determine these effects of HOXA11-AS lncRNA on breast cancer by monitoring the changes of epithelial-mesenchymal markers in the cell. Current research is looking at the potential possibility that breast cancer can be controlled or blocked by regulating the interaction between the lnRNA and epithelium/mesenchyme.

=== Lung ===
In non-small cell lung cancers (NSCLC), researchers found that HOXA11-AS plays a role as an oncogene, and that patients who had decreased HOXA11-AS lncRNA had a greater survival time. In addition, HOXA11-AS lncRNA was found to be up-regulated in the lung tissue of patients with NSCLC. HOXA11-AS lncRNA was found to inhibit apoptosis, promote cancer cell proliferation, promote cell migration, and activate the cell cycle.

=== Ovarian ===
HOXA11-AS lncRNA is studied in cancer research since its over-expression has been reported in epithelial ovarian cancer (EOC). In addition, on the molecular level, single nucleotide polymorphisms (SNPs) have also been observed in the lncRNA sequences of HOXA11-AS in EOC patients. Studies have shown that the SNP variants in these lncRNA sequences do not increase risk of EOC in patients, but may be the driving force of the cancer phenotype.

Regularly, HOXA11-AS lncRNA is a tumor-suppressor that inhibits EOC proliferation and migration; however, in many EOC cases, researchers observed downregulation of the lncRNA in the ovarian tissue.

=== Gastric ===
HOXA11-AS has been shown to be significantly up-regulated in gastric cancer tissue cells. The increase in expression of HOXA11-AS promotes cancer cell migration, tumor cell invasion, as well as metastasis of gastric cancer cells. HOXA11-AS has also been shown to affect cell apoptosis. Research that investigates the mechanism for the upregulation of HOXA11-AS shows that it specifically promotes transcription of beta-catenin through its interaction with EZH2. Additionally, current research has found that HOXA11-AS interacts with miR-1297 and blocks its ability to repress EZH2 protein translation.

=== Colorectal ===
Tissue samples from patients with colorectal cancer (CRC) were observed to have decreased expression of HOXA11-AS lnRNA when compared to normal colon cells. Correlations were seen between patients with larger tumor size, higher carcinoembryonic antigen (CEA), and increased metastases to decreased expression of the lncRNA. These metastases were tumor-node metastases (TNM) and lymphatic metastases. Lymphatic metastases is significant, as it is a common route for cancer cells to migrate to other parts of the body. Scientists were able to determine the effect HOXA11-AS lnRNA had on migration by blocking the transcript with siRNA and observing decreased cell migration and invasion. There was no correlation found between the migration distance and decreased HOXA11-AS lnRNA expression.

== See also ==
- Long noncoding RNA
