= Cis-acting replication element =

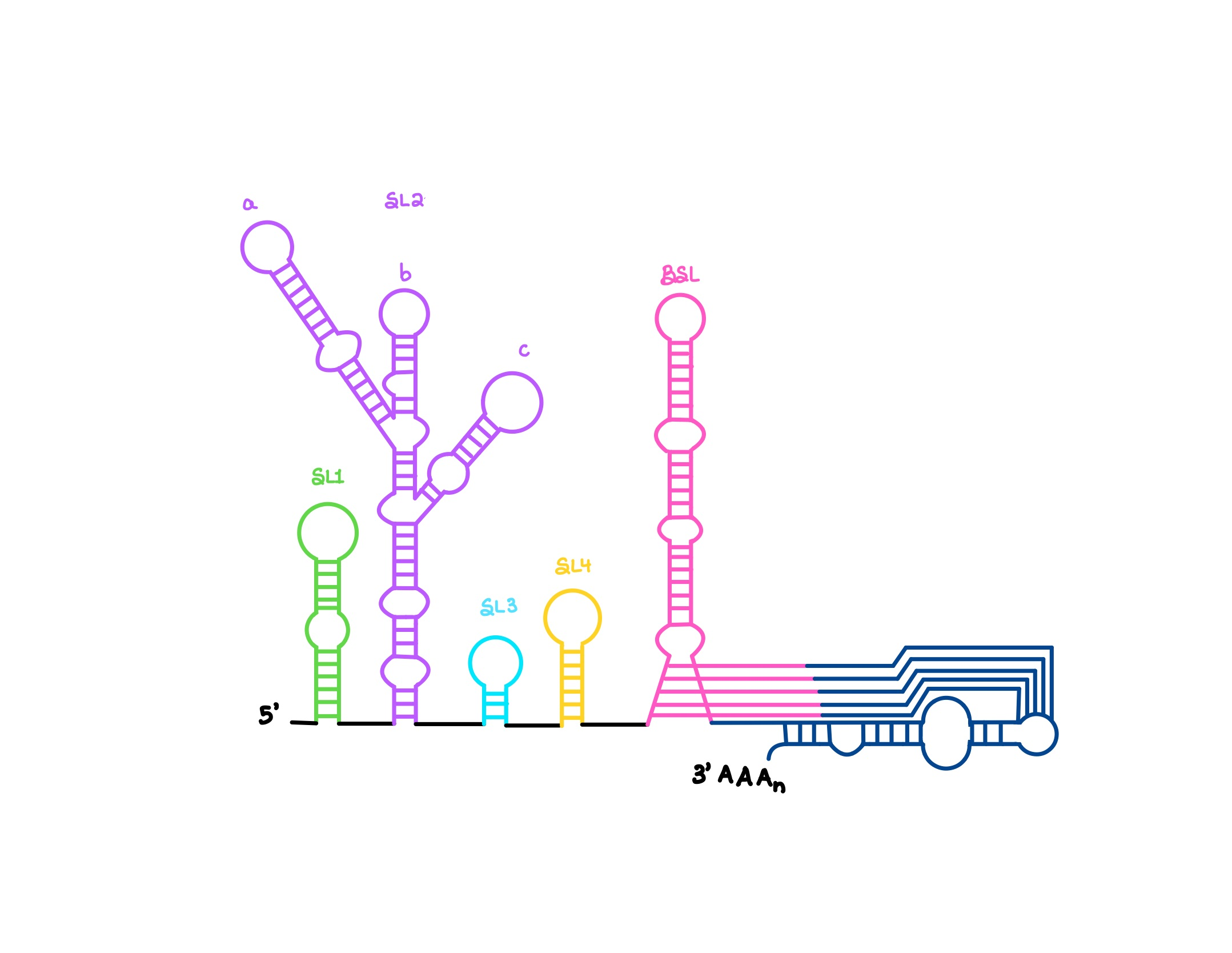
This is a rendering of cis-acting replication element inspired by an image of common cre structure found in Coronavirus from a review paper by Sola et al., 2015

Cis-acting replication elements (cre) bring together the 5′ and 3′ ends during replication of positive-sense single-stranded RNA viruses (for example Picornavirus, Flavivirus, Coronavirus, Togaviruses, Hepatitis C virus) and double-stranded RNA viruses (for example rotavirus and reovirus).

Cre are regions of the viral RNA that act as regulatory signals for essential steps in the virus life cycle. These regions typically fold into loop-like structures and are located in the protein-making part of the genome called the translated region or flanking these regions in parts of the genome called the untranslated region.

These folded RNA structures interact with proteins from the virus or host to manage processes like making new viral proteins and replicating the virus' genetic material. The exact shape and role of these structures vary between different types of viruses.

== Function of cres in Viral Replication ==
=== Positive-Sense RNA Virus Replication ===
The replication process of some positive-sense RNA viruses (ie. enteroviruses) proceeds via protein-primed replication. This refers to replication that requires the binding of a protein to the RNA to begin. Viral protein genome-linked (VPg) plays the essential role of the protein primer that initiates the replication process in these viruses. However, VPg only becomes an active primer when two uridine nucleotides are added to a tyrosine molecule located on the protein. The addition of two uridines to a tyrosine molecule is a process called uridylylation. The uridylylation of the tyrosine molecule on VPg is guided by cres. Once the two necessary uridines have been added, VPg is able to prime the initiation of viral replication.

Cres also affect viral replication through RNA-RNA interactions, specifically interactions between the cre and other regions of the viral genome. These complex and dynamic interactions are necessary for the efficient synthesis of viral DNA and ensure proper internal ribosome entry site (IRES) function. The IRES allows for the recruitment of host ribosomes and the translation of the viral genome in a cap-independent manner. This is an essential step in viral replication as a lot of positive-sense RNA viruses do not possess the chemical cap on the 5' end of their genome necessary for host ribosomes to translate their RNA into protein. Cap-independent translation bypasses this problem, allowing the virus to generate the proteins it needs for replication.

Additionally, cres have been shown to interact with several different host proteins. In Enterovirus A71, cres were shown to bind to the cellular factor insulin-like growth factor 2 mRNA-binding protein 2 (IGF2BP2) with a cooperative relationship. Cre-IGF2BP2 interaction resulted in the increase of both viral replication and IGF2BP2 expression.

=== Function of cre in Coronavirus ===
Coronavirus is another example of a positive sense RNA virus that uses cres for many functions including RNA synthesis, transcription and virus particle formation. Its single stranded genome contains 3 cre structures located at the 3' end of the genome that does not produce protein and 5 at the 5' end. Studies investigating the possible RNA-RNA interactions in coronavirus have found that replication of the viral genome is initiated once the 5' cre binds to the 3' end of the coronavirus genome. This interaction enables the recruitment of RNA dependent RNA polymerase which is a protein used to make new RNA strands. Once RNA synthesis is complete cres are also used to package the viral genome into newly formed virus particles.

== Medical Applications of cre ==
Cre have been identified as attractive antiviral targets for the treatment of diseases caused by viral infections such as hepatitis. In the context of Hepatitis B Virus, scientists have proposed the development of small molecules that could disrupt the binding of cres to the viral polymerase causing early replication inhibition.

== See also ==
- Cis-regulatory element
- List of cis-regulatory RNA elements
- Enterovirus cis-acting replication element and Enterovirus 5′ cloverleaf cis-acting replication element
- Cardiovirus cis-acting replication element (CRE)
- Coronavirus SL-III cis-acting replication element (CRE)
- Rotavirus cis-acting replication element
- Hepatitis C virus cis-acting replication element
- Flavivirus 3′ UTR cis-acting replication element (CRE)
- Potato virus X cis-acting regulatory element
- Human rhinovirus internal cis-acting regulatory element (CRE)
