= Human parechovirus 1 (HPeV1) cis regulatory element (CRE) =

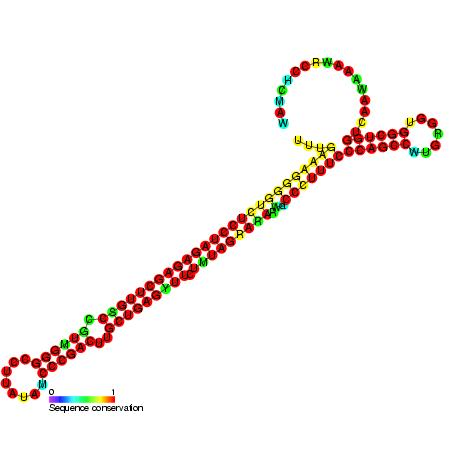
- Predicted secondary structure and sequence conservation of Parecho_CRE

Identifiers
- Symbol: Parecho_CRE
- Rfam: RF00499

Other data
- RNA type: Cis-reg
- Domain(s): Viruses
- SO: SO:0000233
- PDB structures: PDBe

The Human Parechovirus 1 cis regulatory element is an RNA element which is located in the 5'-terminal 112 nucleotides of the genome of human parechovirus 1 (HPeV1). The element consists of two stem-loop structures (SL-A and SL-B) together with a pseudoknot. Disruption of any of these elements impairs both viral replication and growth.

== See also ==
- Human rhinovirus internal cis-acting regulatory element (CRE)
- Rotavirus cis-acting replication element (CRE)
- Parechovirus
