= Paraspeckle =

Cell compartment found in the nucleus's interchromatin space

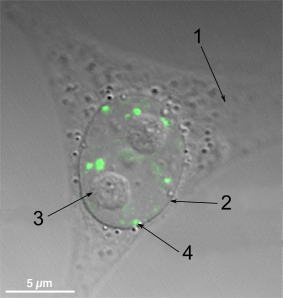
An overlay of a fluorescence micrograph (green) onto a DIC image of a HeLa cell expressing a Yellow fluorescent Protein fusion of Paraspeckle Protein 1 (PSP1): 1. cytoplasm; 2. nucleus; 3. nucleolus; 4. paraspeckles

In cell biology, a paraspeckle is an irregularly shaped compartment of the cell, approximately 0.2-1 μm in size, found in the nucleus's interchromatin space. First documented in HeLa cells, where there are generally 10 to 30 per nucleus, Paraspeckles are now known to also exist in all human primary cells, transformed cell lines, and tissue sections. Their name is derived from their distribution in the nucleus; the "para" is short for parallel and the "speckle" refers to the splicing speckles to which they are always near. Their function is not fully understood, but they are thought to regulate gene expression by sequestrating proteins or mRNAs with inverted repeats in their 3′ UTRs.

== Structure ==
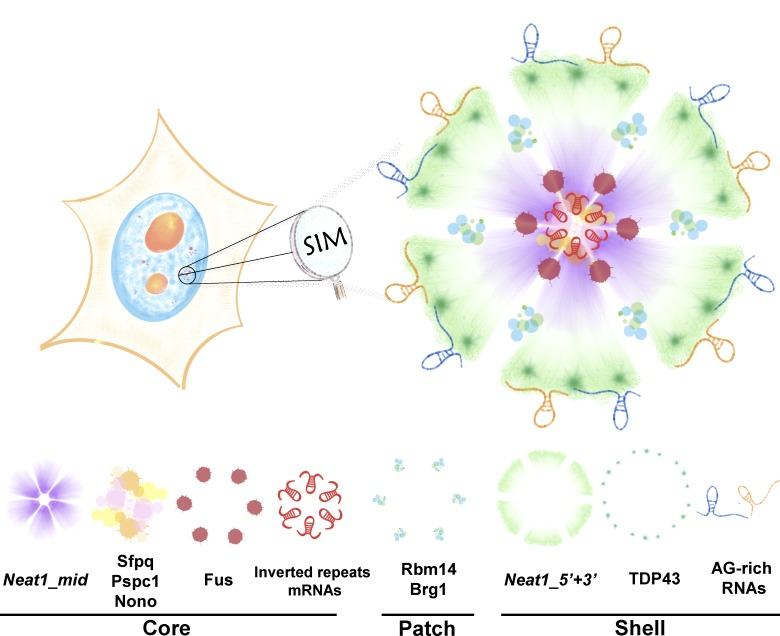
West et al. (2016) suggest that the NEAT1 is folded and bound to paraspeckle core proteins to first form units, which are bridged together by FUS proteins to form the ordered paraspeckle sphere.

Paraspeckles are organised into core-shell spheroidal structures; seven proteins on a scaffold of lncRNA NEAT1 (the 23kb isoform termed NEAT1_2 or NEAT1v2). In 2016, West et al. proposed the currently accepted model for paraspeckles. This was based on their current findings using super-resolution microscopy. Their models state that the NEAT1_2 scaffold folds into a V-shaped unit. Many of these units then are assembled into a core-shell spheroid by FUS proteins. Core proteins SFPQ, NONO, and PSPC1 tightly associate to the assembled structure. Finally, the shell forms, composed of partially co-localised TDP43 proteins. Due to the integral nature of NEAT1 to paraspeckles assembly, assembly is thought to occur close to NEAT1 transcription sites.

It has been noted that paraspeckles have a great deal of commonality both in features and structures with cytoplasmic stress granules, another type of membraneless organelle. This conclusion arose from the fact that both contain common component proteins, become more abundant with stress, seem to function through sequestering other proteins, and both have distinct core or shell regions with predictable localised molecules.

== Localization ==
Paraspeckles are dynamic structures that are altered in response to changes in cellular metabolic activity. They are transcription-dependent. All five of the proposed protein components have RNA recognition motifs (RRMs) and, in the absence of RNA polymerase II transcription, the paraspeckle disappears and all of its associated proponents form a crescent-shaped perinucleolar cap in the nucleolus. This phenomenon is demonstrated during the cell cycle. In the cell cycle, paraspeckles are present during interphase and during all of mitosis except for telophase because, when the two daughter nuclei are formed, there is no RNA Pol II transcription so the protein components instead form a perinucleolar cap. The localization patterns were also duplicated in experiments using transcription inhibiting drugs.

== Function ==
The role of the paraspeckle is not fully understood. It has been suggested that the activity of NONO (a.k.a. p54nrb), a protein component, is dependent on its localisation within the nucleus. Thus, one explanation of the paraspeckle's function is that it provides ordered localisation of its component proteins and to thereby help direct their activity. In turn, this is believed to give the paraspeckle a regulatory function over transcription. Also, a meta-analysis by Fox et al. (2018) links the paraspeckle's regulation to its ability to sequester or steal component proteins and RNAs. This causes other nuclear compartments to be depleted. The current research into the paraspeckle's function is mainly targeted towards the roles of several of its components to indicate larger cellular use; this page mainly focuses on the roles of paraspeckle proteins and NEAT1.

=== Physiological ===
The main insight into their physiological function is their location. Prominent paraspeckles are only found in a subpopulation of cells in murine tissues, e.g. luteal cells or cells at the tip of the gut epithelium. Hence, based on location, paraspeckles are thought to play a role in cancer regulation, reproduction, and viral management.

One focus has been the paraspeckle's role in cancer and cell stress scenarios. Wang Z, Li K, Huang W (2019), records that quantities of NEAT1 and thus paraspeckles are increased in digestive system tumours and respiratory cancers. Furthermore, that expression of NEAT1 is associated with tumour size, stage of cancer, ability to spread, and overall patient survival. While failure to regulate NEAT1 production has been linked to non-cancerous diseases, such as neurodegenerative diseases like Parkinson's or Alzheimer's. However, the function of NEAT1 and paraspeckles is not always positive; it has been proven that they enhance the malignancy and stemness of breast tumours by increasing the expression of the WNT4 gene.

NEAT1 also affects pregnancy and fertility chances, especially in female mammals whose luteal cells are regulated by paraspeckles. This can cause malformation or potential no formation of the corpus luteum leading to infertility, smaller litters, and fewer viable pregnancies. In a study by Chai Y, Liu J, Zhang Z, Liu L (2016), knockout mice (no NEAT1) exhibited malfunctions in epithelial cell proliferation, causing mothers to lactate poorly and reduced litter survival even further. Interestingly these knockout mice exhibit the stochastic effect; the corpus luteum will form in some, but not in all. This reinforces the fact that paraspeckles are inducible by cell stress and that environmental triggers have an impact.

From a viral aspect, NEAT1 levels have an observable impact on infections within cells with many different RNA viruses, including Japanese encephalitis, rabies, HIV, influenza, and Hantaan, as well as the DNA-encoded herpes simplex virus. Wang Z, Li K, Huang W (2019) suggest NEAT1_2/paraspeckles act as a promoter to cell defence triggering and aiding the cellular defence mechanism.

=== Molecular ===
From the molecular perspective, this page examines the paraspeckle's function through NEAT1, NONO (p45nrb), and SFPQ (PSF).

One aspect of the molecular function is the paraspeckle's ability to sequester other molecules affecting transcription. This is done by both NEAT1 and some constituent proteins. NEAT1 is primarily responsible for the paraspeckle's architecture and providing stability to the protein components. Yet, it has also been shown to regulate gene expression. This is done by recruiting transcription factors, sequestering them from gene promoters, and ultimately altering transcription. Furthermore, Wang Z, Li K, Huang W (2019) state that NEAT1 can regulate expression by associating with RNA-binding proteins this regulates RNA splicing events and can manipulate the stability of proteins. Another form of molecule sequestering is through NONO and SFPQ, both proteins can bind to double-stranded RNA that has formed as a result of transcribed inverted repeat motifs.

Another aspect of molecular function is NEAT1's localisation of paraspeckle proteins to direct their activity. In a study by Hirose, T. et al. (2014), when NEAT1_2 levels increase, paraspeckles elongate. This, in turn, not only increases paraspeckle length but also the demand for more paraspeckle proteins to build the tertiary structures required for proper functioning. This reduces nucleoplasmic protein availability. It was noted in their study that this has an impact on the role of free paraspeckle proteins such as SFPQ which normally represses IL-8, an immune-responsive gene, or can activate the ADARB2 gene. Thus, gene regulation can be manipulated not just through sequestering of non-constituent proteins but also paraspeckle constitutive proteins.

== Paraspeckle composition ==
Drawn upon from a table in paraspeckles: Where Long Noncoding RNA Meets Phase Separation
Gene Name	Importance in paraspeckle formation	Prionlike domain^{(a)}	ALS Mutation^{(b)}	Liquid-Liquid phase separation link^{(c)}	Paraspeckle Zone^{(d)}
PARASPECKLE PROTEINS
AHDC1	Dispensable	No			
AKAP8L	Dispensable	Yes			
CELF6	n.d.^{(e)}	No			
CIRBP	Dispensable	No			
CPSF5	Dispensable	No			
CPSF6	Dispensable	No			
CPSF7	Important	No			
DAZAP1	Essential	Yes			
DLX3	n.d.	Yes			
EWSR1	Dispensable	Yes	Yes		
FAM98A	Important	Yes			
FIGN	Important	Yes			
FUS	Essential	Yes	Yes	Yes	Core
HNRNPA1	Important	Yes	Yes	Yes	
HNRNPA1L2	n.d.	Yes			
HNRNPF	n.d.	No			
HNRNPH1	n.d.	Yes			
HNRNPH3	Essential	Yes			
HNRNPK	Essential	No			
HNRNPR	Important	Yes			
HNRNPUL1	Important	Yes			
MEX3A	n.d.	No			
NONO	Essential	Yes			Core
PCED1A	Important	No			
PSPC1	Dispensable	Yes			Core
RBM3	Dispensable	Yes			
RBM4B	Dispensable	No			
RBM7	Dispensable	No			
RBM12	Important	Yes			
RBM14	Essential	Yes		Yes	Patch
RBMX	Dispensable	No			
RUNX3	Dispensable	Yes			
SFPQ	Essential	Yes	Yes		Core
SMARCA4 (BRG1)	Essential	No			Patch
SRSF10	Important	No			
SS18L1	n.d.	Yes	Yes		
TAF14	Important	Yes	Yes		
TDP43	n.d.	Yes	Yes		Shell
UBAP2L	Dispensable	Yes			
ZC3HG	Dispensable	Yes			
PARASPECKLE RNAs
NEAT1	Essential	N/A^{(e)}			5' + 3' Shell, middle core
IR-containing RNAs	Dispensable	N/A			
AG-rich RNAs	Dispensable	N/A			Shell
(a) A type of low-complexity domain rich in polar and small amino acids (Gly, Ala, Ser, Pro, Asn, Gln, Tyr) implicated in forming fibrillar higher-order aggregates (b) Amyotrophic lateral sclerosis, also known as motor neuron disease (c) Partition of components of molecular mixtures into distinct demixed phases (e.g., oil and water). In the cell, many membraneless organelle display liquid behaviours suggesting that they are demixed liquids (d) The paraspeckle zones relate to the super-resolution imaging of paraspeckles. (e) Abbreviations: n.d., not determined; N/A, not applicable
