= WDR53 =

Protein-coding gene in the species Homo sapiens

Identifiers
- Aliases: WDR53, WD repeat domain 53
- External IDs: OMIM: 615110; MGI: 1916230; GeneCards: WDR53

Gene location (Human)
Chr.	Chromosome 3 (human)
Band	3q29	Start	196,554,177 bp
Band	3q29	End	196,568,674 bp

Gene location (Mouse)
Chr.	Chromosome 16 (mouse)
Band	16|16 B2	Start	32,066,045 bp
Band	16|16 B2	End	32,075,901 bp
RNA expression pattern
Bgee	Human / Mouse (ortholog); Top expressed in: left testis; right testis; sperm; oocyte; secondary oocyte; testicle; granulocyte; gonad; islet of Langerhans; monocyte / Top expressed in: spermatid; zygote; spermatocyte; primary oocyte; lumbar spinal ganglion; seminiferous tubule; secondary oocyte; granulocyte; esophagus; otolith organ; More reference expression data
BioGPS	n/a
Orthologs
Databases	NCBI: entry; OMA: entry
Species	Human	Mouse
Entrez	348793	68980
Ensembl	ENSG00000185798	ENSMUSG00000022787
UniProt	Q7Z5U6	Q9DB94
RefSeq (mRNA)	NM_001345906; NM_001345907; NM_001345908; NM_001345909; NM_001345910 NM_001345911; NM_001345912; NM_001345913; NM_001345914; NM_001345915; NM_001345917; NM_001345918; NM_182627	NM_001185162; NM_026898; NM_001399294
RefSeq (protein)	NP_001332835; NP_001332836; NP_001332837; NP_001332838; NP_001332839 NP_001332840; NP_001332841; NP_001332842; NP_001332843; NP_001332844; NP_001332846; NP_001332847; NP_872433	NP_001172091; NP_081174
Location (UCSC)	Chr 3: 196.55 – 196.57 Mb	Chr 16: 32.07 – 32.08 Mb
PubMed search
- Wikidata
View/Edit Human	View/Edit Mouse

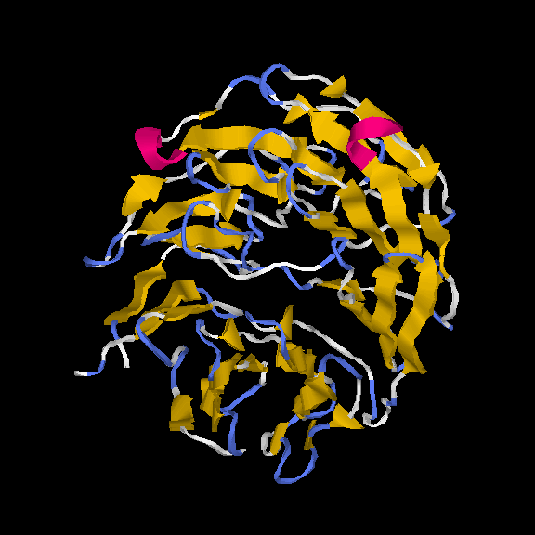
WDR53 structure. Zhang Lab, University of Michigan

WD repeat containing protein 53 (WDR53) is a protein that in humans is encoded by the WDR53 gene. It has been identified in the human genome by the Human Genome Project but has, at the moment, lacked experimental procedures to understand the function. It has short up and down stream untranslated regions as well as WD40 repeat regions which have been linked to various functions (signal transduction, transcription regulation, apoptosis etc.).

== Expression ==
In humans, it has been shown to be highly expressed in the tissue of the testes with low, almost untraceable, expression in other tissues.

== Gene ==
WDR53 transcribes an mRNA with 1701 base pairs. This gene is on the negative strand of chromosome 3 and has four exons. The mRNA has a promoter labeled GXP_232341 from Genomatix and is 1253 bp long.

== mRNA ==
WDR53 can be alternately spliced into 6 different mRNA products.

== Protein ==
The translated protein from WDR53 contains seven identifiable WD40 regions encoded by 358 amino acids. The protein product is 38.99 kDa.

=== Subcellular localization ===
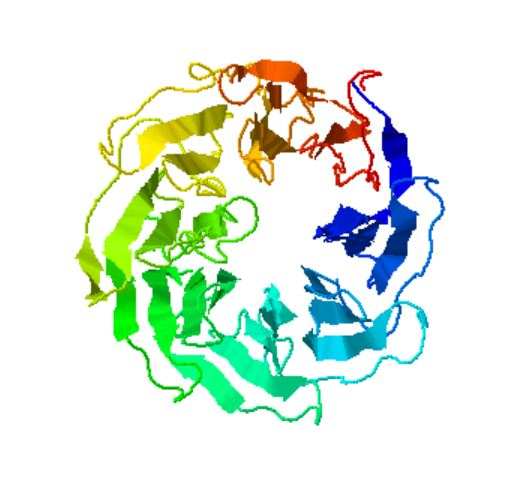
Cone shape formed by WDR53

WDR53 has been predicted to be localized in the nucleus of cells. The protein even possesses one nuclear localization signal.

=== Structure ===
The secondary structure of WDR53 has been predicted to be predominantly alternations between loops and strands with little to no helices. These WD40 regions fold into a tertiary propeller like structure that has been conserved in multiple different genes across the human genome as well as other Eukaryotas. These seven repeats form into a cone like shape in which the center depression most likely acts as a binding point for other proteins.

=== Interacting proteins ===
There are two likely proteins that interact with WDR53: WDR5 and MCPH1. Each of these proteins possess regions that have a high likelihood of forming and association with WDR53. Both proteins are expressed in the testes as well which strengthens the likelihood of there being a true association.

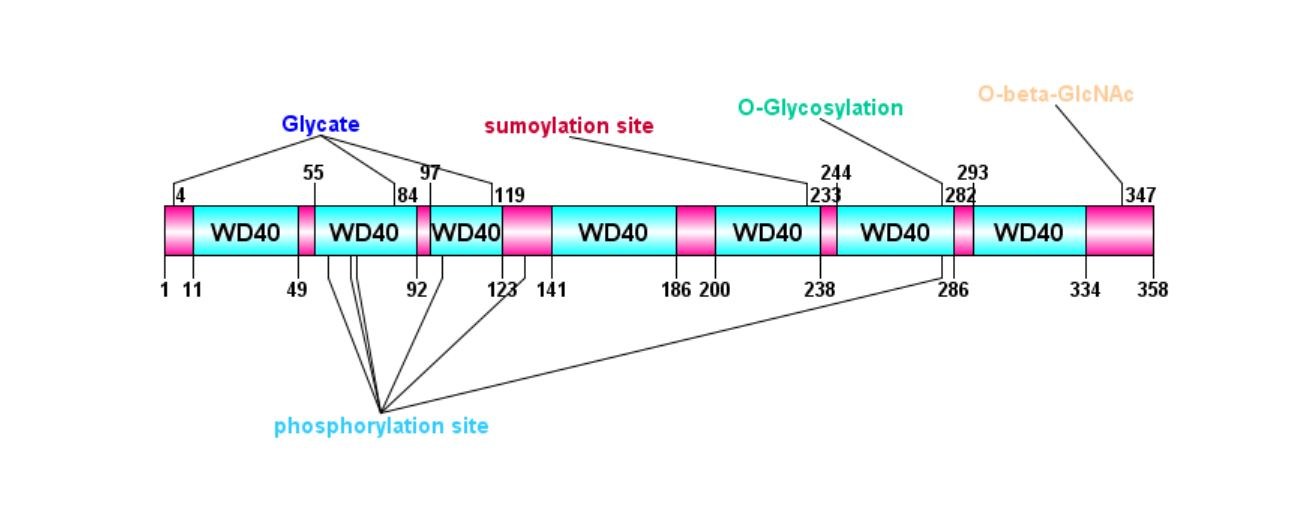
Protein map showing post-translational modifications.

=== Post-translational modifications ===
WDR53 undergoes protein modifications such as phosphorylation, sumoylation, and glycosylation.

== Homology ==
Because WD40 repeats are conserved across many eukaryotes, WDR53 is also conserved among many eukaryotes even into certain members of the plantae kingdom such as the Apple.

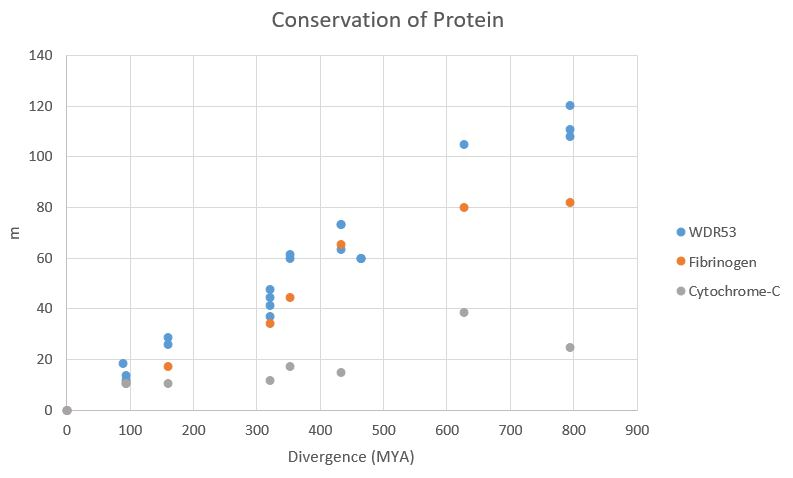
Mutation rate of WDR53 in comparison to Fibrinogen and Cytochrome-C across organisms

Orthologs
Organism	Accession number	Percent identity	Divergence from Homo sapiens (MYA)
Minke Whale	XP_007171665	89	94
Tasmanian Devil	XP_003763726	75	160
Chinese Alligator	XP_006037148	69	320
King Cobra	ETE62634	62	320
American Bullfrog	PIO13894	54	353
Zebrafish	XP_001339961.1	48	432
Crown-of-Thorns Starfish	XP_022093401	35	627
Eastern Oyster	XP_022289021	30	794
Apple	AFV94635	26	1624
