= NEAT1 =

Identifiers
- Aliases: NEAT1, LINC00084, NCRNA00084, TncRNA, VINC, nuclear paraspeckle assembly transcript 1 (non-protein coding), nuclear paraspeckle assembly transcript 1
- External IDs: OMIM: 612769; GeneCards: NEAT1

Gene location (Human)
Chr.	Chromosome 11 (human)
Band	11q13.1	Start	65,422,774 bp
Band	11q13.1	End	65,445,540 bp
RNA expression pattern
Bgee	Human / Mouse (ortholog); Top expressed in: right lobe of thyroid gland; left lobe of thyroid gland; nipple; renal medulla; minor salivary glands; right uterine tube; cardia; mucosa of paranasal sinus; right adrenal cortex; mucosa of pharynx / n/a; More reference expression data
BioGPS	n/a
Orthologs
Databases	NCBI: entry; OMA: entry
Species	Human	Mouse
Entrez	283131	n/a
Ensembl	ENSG00000245532	n/a
UniProt	n a	n/a
RefSeq (mRNA)	n/a	n/a
RefSeq (protein)	n/a	n/a
Location (UCSC)	Chr 11: 65.42 – 65.45 Mb	n/a
PubMed search		n/a
- Wikidata
View/Edit Human

NEAT1 (Nuclear Enriched Abundant Transcript 1) is a ~3.2 kb novel nuclear long non-coding RNA (RIKEN cDNA 2310043N10Rik). It is also known as Virus Inducible NonCoding RNA (VINC) or MEN epsilon RNA. It is transcribed from the multiple endocrine neoplasia locus.

Expression of NEAT1 is induced in mouse brains during infection by Japanese encephalitis virus and rabies virus. NEAT1 is constitutively expressed in a number of non-neuronal tissues and cell lines.

NEAT1 localizes to specific nuclear structures called paraspeckles. NEAT1 RNA interacts with a paraspeckle protein known as P54nrb or NONO and it is essential for paraspeckle formation. Some studies demonstrate that NEAT1 RNA is essential for the formation and maintenance of paraspeckles. Thus, this novel noncoding RNA appears to have an important structural role in the nuclear paraspeckles. There are two isoforms of NEAT1, NEAT1_1 and NEAT1_2, which are regulated by alternative 3′-end processing. Mutant mice lacking Neat1 do not exhibit overt external abnormalities, but the female mice exhibit decreased fertility and lactation defect.

== See also ==
- MALAT1-associated small cytoplasmic RNA
- Long non-coding RNA
