= MALAT1 =

Non-coding RNA in the species Homo sapiens

Identifiers
- Aliases: MALAT1, HCN, LINC00047, MALAT-1, NCRNA00047, NEAT2, PRO2853, mascRNA, metastasis associated lung adenocarcinoma transcript 1 (non-protein coding), metastasis associated lung adenocarcinoma transcript 1
- External IDs: OMIM: 607924; GeneCards: MALAT1

Gene location (Human)
| Chr. | Chromosome 11 (human) |
| Band | 11q13.1 | Start | 65,497,688 bp |
| Band | 11q13.1 | End | 65,506,516 bp |
RNA expression pattern
| Bgee | Human / Mouse (ortholog); Top expressed in: renal medulla; trigeminal ganglion; cardia; corpus callosum; pylorus; seminal vesicula; Achilles tendon; external globus pallidus; spinal ganglia; pars compacta / n/a; More reference expression data |
| BioGPS | n/a |
Orthologs
| Databases | NCBI: entry; OMA: entry |
| Species | Human | Mouse |
| Entrez | 378938 | n/a |
| Ensembl | ENSG00000251562 | n/a |
| UniProt | n a | n/a |
| RefSeq (mRNA) | n/a | n/a |
| RefSeq (protein) | n/a | n/a |
| Location (UCSC) | Chr 11: 65.5 – 65.51 Mb | n/a |
| PubMed search | | n/a |
- Wikidata
| View/Edit Human |

Conserved secondary structure in Metastasis associated lung adenocarcinoma transcript 1
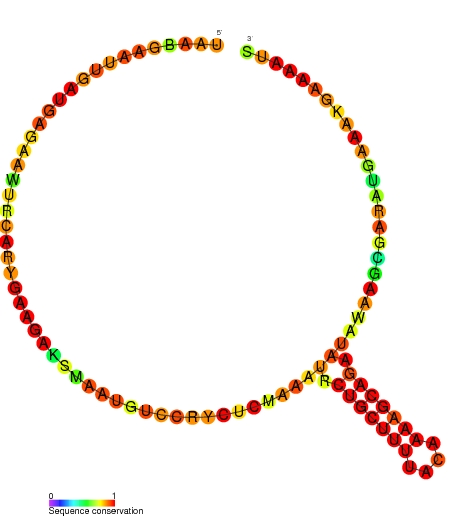
- Predicted secondary structure and sequence conservation of MALAT1

Identifiers
- Symbol: MALAT1
- Rfam: RF01871

Other data
- RNA type: Gene;
- Domain: Eukaryota;
- GO: GO:2000147
- SO: SO:0001263
- PDB structures: PDBe

MALAT1 (Metastasis Associated Lung Adenocarcinoma Transcript 1) also known as NEAT2 (Nuclear-Enriched Abundant Transcript 2) is an infrequently spliced long non-coding RNA, which is highly conserved amongst mammals and highly expressed in the nucleus. It regulates the expression of metastasis-associated genes. It also positively regulates cell motility via the transcriptional and/or post-transcriptional regulation of motility-related genes. MALAT1 may play a role in temperature-dependent sex determination in the Red-eared slider turtle (Trachemys scripta).

== Expression in alcoholic brains ==
Transcripts of MALAT1 are significantly increased in the cerebellum of human alcoholics, as well as in similar regions of rat brains after the withdrawal of ethanol vapours. This alcohol-induced upregulation of MALAT1 may be responsible for differential expression of a number of proteins which contribute to ethanol tolerance and dependency in humans.

== Prognostic potential in cancer ==
Elevated MALAT1 expression is correlated with poor overall survival in various types of cancer, suggesting that this gene is a prognostic factor for different types of cancer. MALAT1 is implicated in multiple hallmarks of cancer, influencing cell proliferation, migration, angiogenesis, evasion of apoptosis, epithelial–mesenchymal transition, and cancer stem cell behavior. It exerts these effects through diverse mechanisms, including regulation of RNA splicing, modification of chromatin states, sponging of microRNAs, and remodeling of protein interactions, thereby modulating major oncogenic pathways such as PI3K/AKT, Wnt/β-catenin, TGF-β/Smad, mTOR, and Hippo–YAP signaling. MALAT1 also shapes the tumor immune microenvironment, contributing to immune evasion, therapy resistance, metabolic reprogramming, and exosome-mediated tumor–stromal communication. Although predominantly oncogenic, it can act as a tumor suppressor in a context-dependent manner.

== See also ==
- Long non-coding RNA
- MALAT1-associated small cytoplasmic RNA
- miPEP-52
