= MALAT1-associated small cytoplasmic RNA =

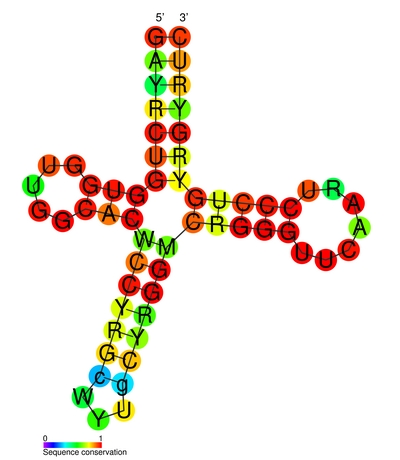
- Predicted secondary structure and sequence conservation of mascRNA-menRNA

Identifiers
- Symbol: mascRNA-menRNA
- Rfam: RF01684

Other data
- RNA type: Gene
- Domain: Eukaryota
- GO: GO:2000147
- SO: SO:0001263
- PDB structures: PDBe

MALAT1-associated small cytoplasmic RNA, also known as mascRNA, is a non-coding RNA found in the cytosol. This is a small RNA, roughly 53–61 nucleotides in length, that is processed from a much longer ncRNA called MALAT1 by an enzyme called RNase P. This RNA is expressed in many different human tissues, is highly conserved by evolution and shares a remarkable similarity to tRNA which is also produced by RNase P, yet this RNA is not aminoacylated in HeLa cells. The primary transcript, MALAT1 (metastasis associated lung adenocarcinoma transcript 1), appears to be upregulated in several malignant cancers. Another small RNA that is homologous to mascRNA, called menRNA, is processed from another long ncRNA called MEN beta.

MALAT1 appears to be involved in the regulation of alternative splicing. MALAT1 interacts with SR proteins, influencing the distribution of these in nuclear speckle domains.

== See also ==
- Long noncoding RNA
- MALAT1
- NEAT1
