= Human rhinovirus internal cis-acting regulatory element =

Human rhinovirus internal cis-acting regulatory element (CRE)
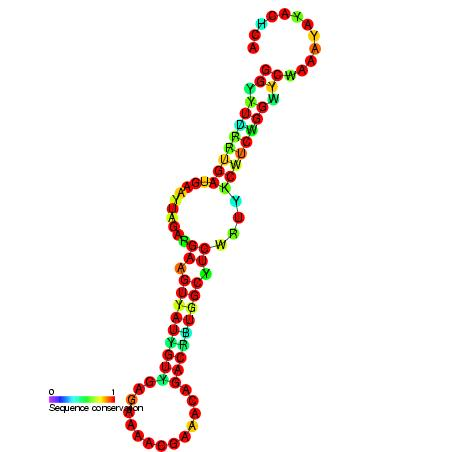
- Predicted secondary structure and sequence conservation of Rhino_CRE

Identifiers
- Symbol: Rhino_CRE
- Rfam: RF00220

Other data
- RNA type: Cis-reg
- Domain(s): Viruses
- SO: SO:0000233
- PDB structures: PDBe

Human rhinovirus internal cis-acting regulatory element (CRE) is a CRE from the human rhinoviruses. The CRE is located within the genome segment encoding the capsid proteins so is found in a protein coding region. The element is essential for efficient viral replication and it has been suggested that the CRE is required for initiation of minus-strand RNA synthesis.

== See also ==
- Human parechovirus 1 (HPeV1) cis regulatory element (CRE)
- Rotavirus cis-acting replication element (CRE)
