= Perinucleolar compartment =

The perinucleolar compartment (PNC) is a subnuclear body characterized by its location at the periphery of the nucleolus. The PNC participates in the patterned compartmentalization inside the nucleus to organize the specialized functions. It is almost exclusively found in oncogenic cells and enriched with RNA binding proteins as well as RNA polymerase III transcripts.

== History ==
The perinucleolar compartment was first discovered on the periphery of the nucleus in 1992 by Andrea Getti et al. while studying the hnRNPI/PTB (polypyrimidine tract binding) protein. Getti found that in addition to the nucleoplasm, the hnRNPI was staining a "discrete unidentified structure" always opposite of the nucleoli. In 1995, A. Gregory Matera et al. first gave the structure its name "perinucleolar compartment" after finding several RNA polymerase III transcripts as well as hnRNPI at the nucleolar rim. Sui Huang et al. has extensively researched the perinucleolar compartment and in 1997 were the first to study the PNC in a large number of human cancer cells.

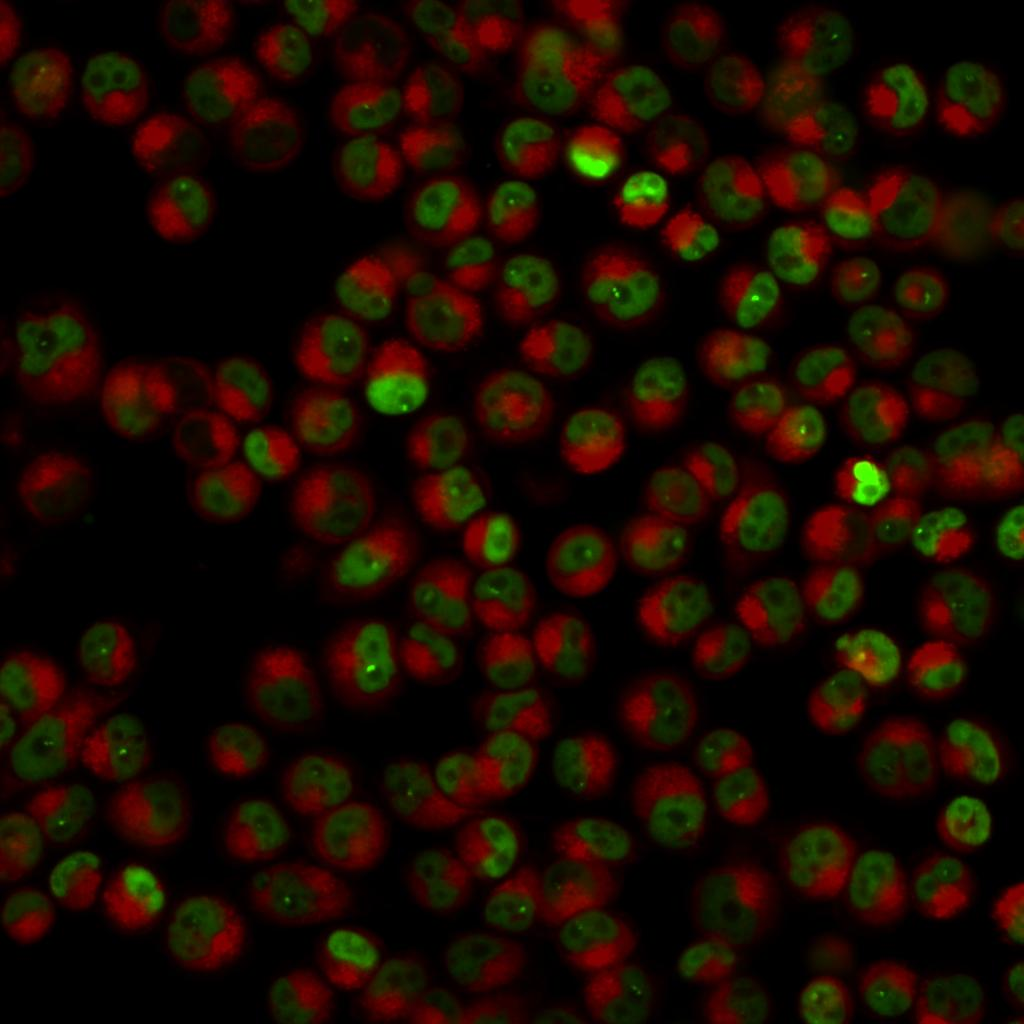
Small molecular probe that targets PNC in cancer cells.

== Structure ==
The PNC is a dynamic and irregular structure composed of multiple dense strands found primarily in transformed cancer cells. Electron microscopy on HeLa cells confirmed that the thick strands are 0.25 - 4 μm in length and 80 - 180 nm in diameter. These strands form a meshwork directly in contact with the nucleolus, and in some instances extend into the nucleolus.

=== RNA ===
The perinucleolar compartment relies on RNA binding proteins and RNA polymerase III transcripts to stabilize its structure. Therefore, the continuous production of these transcripts is pivotal. During permeabilization of cells, RNase, but not DNase, destroys the PNC establishing the importance of RNA to the structure. Upon inhibition of RNA pol III transcripts, mature RNA pol III is not altered. Therefore, the PNC only relies on newly transcribed RNA pol III transcripts.

=== DNA ===
The perinucleolar compartment also relies on DNA integrity as well as a DNA locus for stability. DNA studies with DNA-intercalators, DNA-binding molecules, and DNA-damagers established that the PNC dissociates with certain DNA damage. Additionally, DNA damage inhibitors do not prevent the disassembly of PNC, but they do prevent the reformation of the PNC proving the importance of DNA integrity.

The reliance on the DNA structure as well as the fact that daughter cells are exact replicates of the mother cells suggests the PNC is associated with a DNA locus, although, the exact locus is undetermined. In the S-phase of the cell cycle, the PNC nucleates at a DNA locus and replicates undisturbed with DNA. This shows a direct correlation between PNC and DNA replication cycles, and further distinguishes the reliance of the perinucleolar compartment on DNA.

== Function ==
Although the precise function has not been established, the perinucleolar compartment is concentrated with RNA binding proteins as well as newly transcribed RNA polymerase III transcripts indicating a probable role in RNA metabolism. Predominately found in transformed cancer cells, the prevalence is less than 5% in normal cell lines, but 15-100% in cancer cell lines. The PNC is directly proportional to metastasis as well as linked to malignancy. Thus, it is being further researched in its potential to be a biomarker for cancer.

=== Cell cycle ===
The perinucleolar compartment follows the mitotic pathway to form new daughter cells that are similar in size and shape to the mother cells. However, they can vary in size between different cancer cell lines. While remaining an individualized structure, the PNC remains in direct contact with the nucleoli during interphase and mimics the nucleoli during mitosis. In prophase, both gradually deconstruct until reassembly during late telophase in the new daughter cell.

=== RNA metabolism ===
The perinucleolar compartment was first discovered due to characterizing the polypyrimidine tract-binding protein (PTB), which is an RNA binding protein involved with pre-mRNA splicing, stability, and regulating translation. The PTB and other binding proteins are localized in the PNC to primarily process RNA polymerase II. In addition, many other small noncoding pol III RNA complexes which regulate pre-rRNA processing are localized in the PNC. Hence, these PNC proteins may play a role in RNA metabolism and research is continually being conducted to scientifically prove this.

== Clinical significance ==
Perinuclolar compartments form in blastomas, carcinomas, and sarcomas and exclusively represent malignant cells in solid tumor tissues. The occurrence of the PNC directly correlates with the growth and metastasis of cancer cells. For example, in a study on Hepatocellular carcinoma (HCC), there was a direct parallel between the increased occurrence of PNCs with an increase in metastasis as well as malignant cell lines. Likewise, the anti-metastasis was directly proportional to the PNC inhibition further demonstrating the potential for PNCs to be a biomarker across cancer.
