= Non-POU domain-containing octamer-binding protein =

Protein-coding gene in the species Homo sapiens

NONO
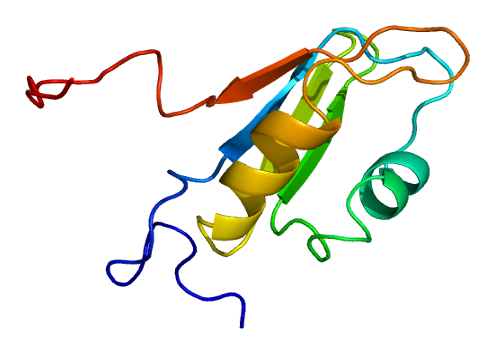

Identifiers
- Aliases: NONO, NMT55, NRB54, P54, P54NRB, PPP1R114, MRXS34, non-POU domain containing, octamer-binding, non-POU domain containing octamer binding
- External IDs: OMIM: 300084; MGI: 1855692; GeneCards: NONO
Available structures
PDB	Ortholog search: PDBe RCSB
PDB	List of PDB id codes 3SDE

Gene location (Human)
Chr.	X chromosome (human)
Band	Xq13.1	Start	71,254,814 bp
Band	Xq13.1	End	71,301,522 bp

Gene location (Mouse)
Chr.	X chromosome (mouse)
Band	X|X D	Start	100,472,924 bp
Band	X|X D	End	100,492,197 bp
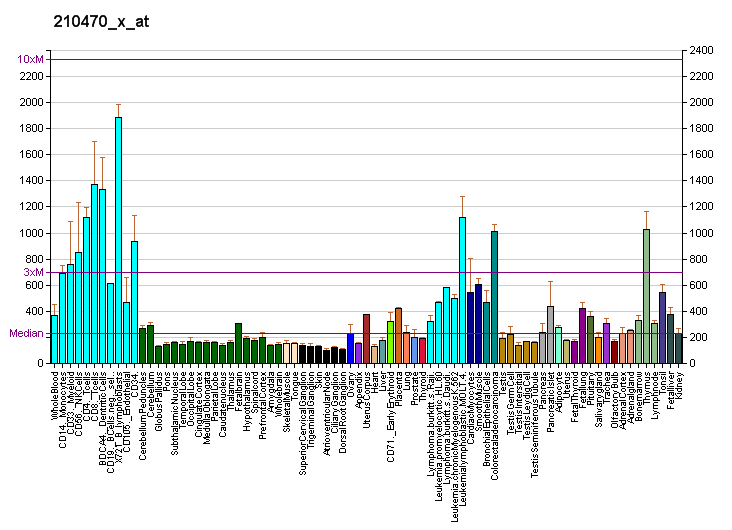

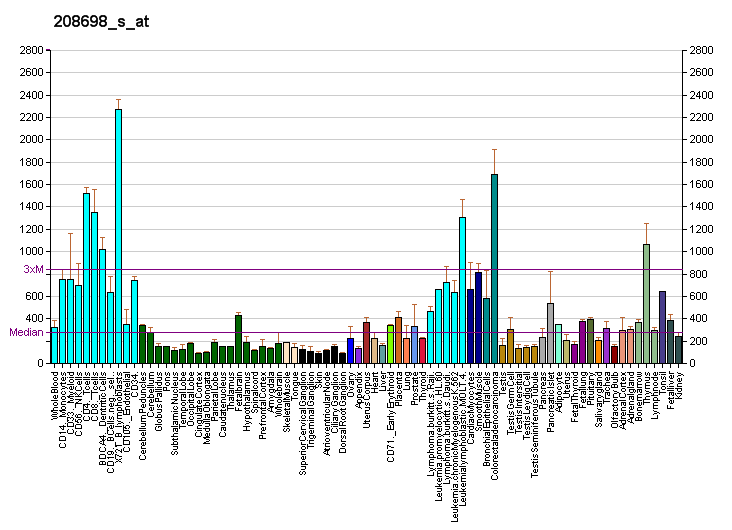
RNA expression pattern
Bgee	Human / Mouse (ortholog); Top expressed in: ganglionic eminence; ventricular zone; thymus; trachea; cerebellar vermis; epithelium of bronchus; paraflocculus of cerebellum; stromal cell of endometrium; ovary; left ovary / Top expressed in: genital tubercle; ventricular zone; tail of embryo; yolk sac; neural layer of retina; zygote; embryo; embryo; dentate gyrus of hippocampal formation granule cell; lip; More reference expression data
BioGPS	More reference expression data
Gene ontology
Molecular function	RNA polymerase II cis-regulatory region sequence-specific DNA binding; DNA binding; chromatin binding; transcription cis-regulatory region binding; protein binding; identical protein binding; nucleic acid binding; RNA binding
Cellular component	paraspeckles; nuclear speck; membrane; nuclear matrix; nucleoplasm; RNA polymerase II transcription regulator complex; nucleolus; nucleus
Biological process	mRNA splicing, via spliceosome; DNA recombination; regulation of transcription, DNA-templated; rhythmic process; mRNA processing; transcription, DNA-templated; cellular response to DNA damage stimulus; regulation of circadian rhythm; circadian rhythm; RNA splicing; negative regulation of transcription, DNA-templated; negative regulation of oxidative stress-induced neuron intrinsic apoptotic signaling pathway; DNA repair; activation of innate immune response; immune system process; innate immune response
Sources:Amigo / QuickGO
Orthologs
Databases	NCBI: entry; OMA: entry
Species	Human	Mouse
Entrez	4841	53610
Ensembl	ENSG00000147140	ENSMUSG00000031311
UniProt	Q15233	Q99K48
RefSeq (mRNA)	NM_007363; NM_001145408; NM_001145409; NM_001145410	NM_001252518; NM_023144
RefSeq (protein)	NP_001138880; NP_001138881; NP_001138882; NP_031389	NP_001239447; NP_075633
Location (UCSC)	Chr X: 71.25 – 71.3 Mb	Chr X: 100.47 – 100.49 Mb
PubMed search
- Wikidata
View/Edit Human	View/Edit Mouse

Non-POU domain-containing octamer-binding protein (NonO) is a protein that in humans is encoded by the NONO gene.

The NonO protein belongs to the Drosophila behaviour/human splicing (DBHS) family of proteins. Proteins in the DHBS family include mammalian SFPQ (splicing factor, proline- and glutamine-rich; a.k.a. PSF), NonO (Non-POU domain-containing octamer-binding protein; a.k.a. p54nrb), PSPC1 (paraspeckle component 1; a.k.a. PSP1), invertebrate NONA (Protein no-on-transient A), and Hrp65.

== Interactions ==
NonO has been shown to interact with SFPQ, SPI1, and Androgen receptor.

== Functions ==
NonO is involved with many nuclear processes and binds to both DNA and RNA.

As with all DBHS proteins, NonO is described as a multifunctional nuclear protein. NonO is implicated in many biological functions including pre-mRNA splicing, activation of transcription, termination of transcription, DNA unwinding and pairing, and maintaining correct circadian clock function.

NonO binds with the Rasd1 protein, and the resulting dimer is hypothesized to modulate the function of NonO to downregulate the expression of the CREB genes NR4A1 and NR4A2.

NonO binds to SFPQ to form a heterodimer that interacts with the MATR3 protein. The interaction of these three proteins may be part of the process in the nucleus that is responsible for the retention of RNAs that are defective, not yet mature enough to be exported, or are designed to be retained in nucleus.

== Gene location ==
NonO (Human) is encoded by the NONO gene which is located on the plus strand of the X chromosome.

== Role in disease ==
=== Melanoma ===
NONO has been shown to be more strongly expressed in melanoma cell lines and melanoma tissue samples compared to normal human cell lines and normal skin tissue. Studies have found that the knockout of NonO from melanoma cell lines results in both reduced proliferation rates of the cancer cells and a significant decrease in the potential migration of the cancer cells.

=== Breast cancer ===
Studies into breast cancers have found that the loss or alteration of NonO in conjunction with the loss of the estrogen receptor hERα results in more aggressive breast cancers which show an increase in both tumor size and metastases.

=== Intellectual disability associated with non-compaction cardiomyopathy ===
Studies in humans and mice have identified that NONO null mutations likely lead to the development of a clinically recognizable intellectual disability with cognitive and affective deficits. It was later found that these pathogenic variants were also strongly associated with cardiomyopathy with left ventricular noncompaction and sometimes Ebstein's anomaly.

== Structure ==
As with other proteins of the DBHS family, NonO protein functions rarely functions alone and primarily forms homo- and heterodimers with other DBHS proteins to perform its various functions. It is theorized that these dimers may have different functions that are specific to the type of cell that they are found in.

It is speculated that the phosphorylation state of NonO acts to direct the protein's many disparate functions within the nucleus.

== Tissue specificity ==
NonO is found in the nucleus of most mammalian cells and is primarily distributed within the nucleoplasm, it can also be found concentrated within sub-nuclear domains known as paraspeckles.

NonO has also been observed within the brain, localized in the cytoplasm of hippocampal neurons that are associated with RNA transport granules. It is also highly expressed within heart tissue.

== Discovery ==
NonO was first discovered in 1993 by researchers at Cold Springs Harbor Laboratory. Due to the protein being originally identified as a RNA-binding protein it was named p54nrb for Nuclear RNA-binding protein, 54 kDa.
