= WDR5 =

Protein-coding gene in the species Homo sapiens

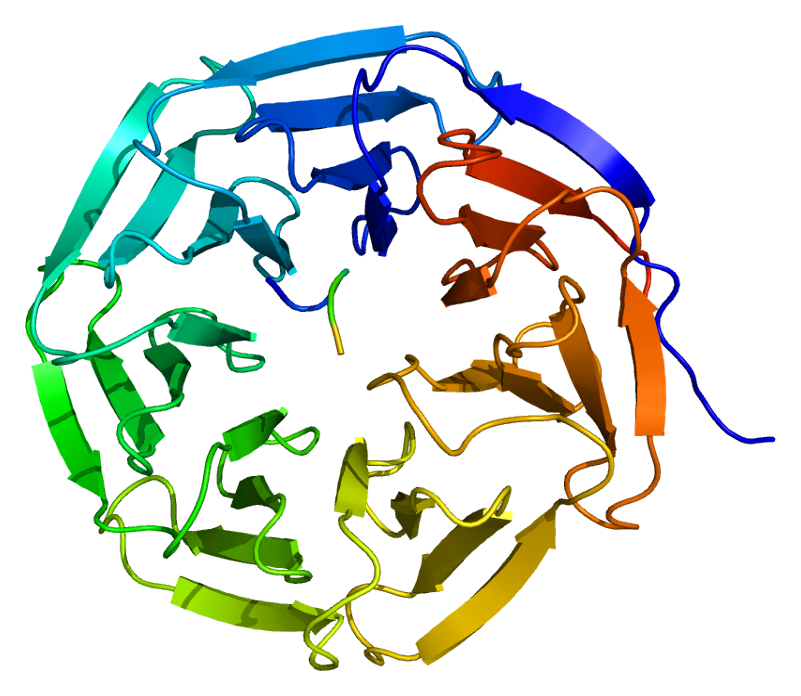

Identifiers
- Aliases: WDR5, BIG-3, CFAP89, SWD3, WD repeat-containing protein 5, WD repeat domain 5
- External IDs: OMIM: 609012; MGI: 2155884; GeneCards: WDR5
Available structures
PDB	Ortholog search: PDBe RCSB
PDB	List of PDB id codes 2CNX, 2CO0, 2G99, 2G9A, 2GNQ, 2H13, 2H14, 2H68, 2H6K, 2H6N, 2H6Q, 2H9L, 2H9M, 2H9N, 2H9P, 2O9K, 3EG6, 3EMH, 3MXX, 3N0D, 3N0E, 3P4F, 3PSL, 3SMR, 3UR4, 3UVK, 3UVL, 3UVM, 3UVN, 3UVO, 4A7J, 4CY1, 4CY2, 4ERQ, 4ERY, 4ERZ, 4ES0, 4ESG, 4EWR, 4GM3, 4GM8, 4GM9, 4GMB, 4IA9, 4O45, 4QL1, 4Y7R, 5EAL, 5EAP, 5EAR, 4QQE, 5EAM

Gene location (Human)
Chr.	Chromosome 9 (human)
Band	9q34.2	Start	134,135,365 bp
Band	9q34.2	End	134,159,968 bp

Gene location (Mouse)
Chr.	Chromosome 2 (mouse)
Band	2|2 A3	Start	27,405,169 bp
Band	2|2 A3	End	27,426,547 bp
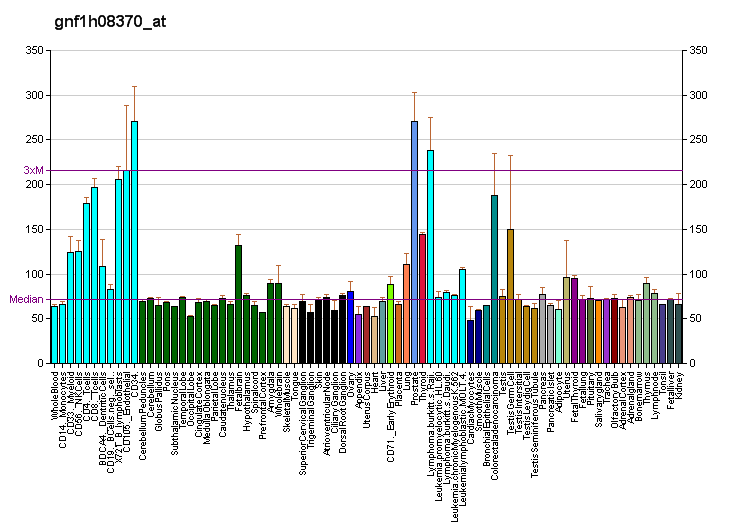
RNA expression pattern
Bgee	Human / Mouse (ortholog); Top expressed in: skin of arm; left testis; right testis; sperm; gastrocnemius muscle; cerebellar hemisphere; right hemisphere of cerebellum; anterior pituitary; secondary oocyte; gonad / Top expressed in: secondary oocyte; primary oocyte; zygote; primitive streak; medullary collecting duct; epiblast; granulocyte; renal corpuscle; somite; ventricular zone; More reference expression data
BioGPS	More reference expression data
Gene ontology
Molecular function	histone methyltransferase activity (H3-K4 specific); histone acetyltransferase activity (H4-K8 specific); histone acetyltransferase activity (H4-K5 specific); methylated histone binding; protein binding; histone acetyltransferase activity (H4-K16 specific); histone-lysine N-methyltransferase activity; histone binding
Cellular component	Set1C/COMPASS complex; intracellular anatomical structure; nucleoplasm; MLL1 complex; MLL3/4 complex; histone acetyltransferase complex; nucleus; histone methyltransferase complex; ciliary basal body
Biological process	skeletal system development; regulation of transcription, DNA-templated; transcription, DNA-templated; histone H4-K5 acetylation; histone H3-K4 methylation; histone H3 acetylation; histone H4-K16 acetylation; neuron projection development; histone H4-K8 acetylation; cilium assembly; post-translational protein modification; regulation of megakaryocyte differentiation; chromatin organization
Sources:Amigo / QuickGO
Orthologs
Databases	NCBI: entry; OMA: entry
Species	Human	Mouse
Entrez	11091	140858
Ensembl	ENSG00000196363	ENSMUSG00000026917
UniProt	P61964	P61965
RefSeq (mRNA)	NM_017588; NM_052821	NM_080848
RefSeq (protein)	NP_060058; NP_438172	NP_543124
Location (UCSC)	Chr 9: 134.14 – 134.16 Mb	Chr 2: 27.41 – 27.43 Mb
PubMed search
- Wikidata
View/Edit Human	View/Edit Mouse

WD repeat-containing protein 5 is a protein that in humans is encoded by the WDR5 gene.

This gene encodes a member of the WD repeat protein family. WD repeats are minimally conserved regions of approximately 40 amino acids typically bracketed by gly-his and trp-asp (GH-WD), which may facilitate formation of heterotrimeric or multiprotein complexes. Members of this family are involved in a variety of cellular processes, including cell cycle progression, signal transduction, apoptosis, and gene regulation. This protein contains 7 WD repeats. Alternatively spliced transcript variants encoding the same protein have been identified.

== Interactions ==
WDR5 has been shown to interact with Host cell factor C1 and MLL. It also interacts with the long non-coding RNA HOTTIP and to the lncRNA NeST. WDR5 is a key determinant for MYC recruitment to chromatin
