= HOXA11 =

Protein-coding gene in the species Homo sapiens

Identifiers
- Aliases: HOXA11, HOX1, HOX1I, RUSAT1, homeobox A11
- External IDs: OMIM: 142958; MGI: 96172; GeneCards: HOXA11

Gene location (Human)
Chr.	Chromosome 7 (human)
Band	7p15.2	Start	27,181,157 bp
Band	7p15.2	End	27,185,232 bp

Gene location (Mouse)
Chr.	Chromosome 6 (mouse)
Band	6 B3|6 25.4 cM	Start	52,219,086 bp
Band	6 B3|6 25.4 cM	End	52,222,790 bp
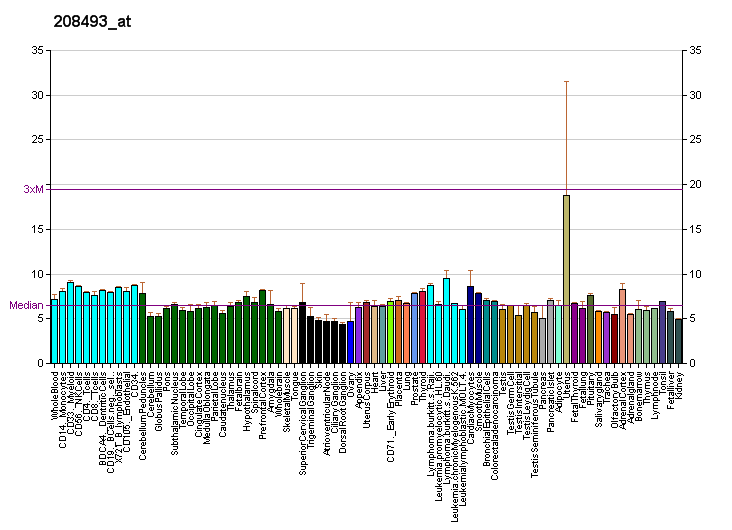

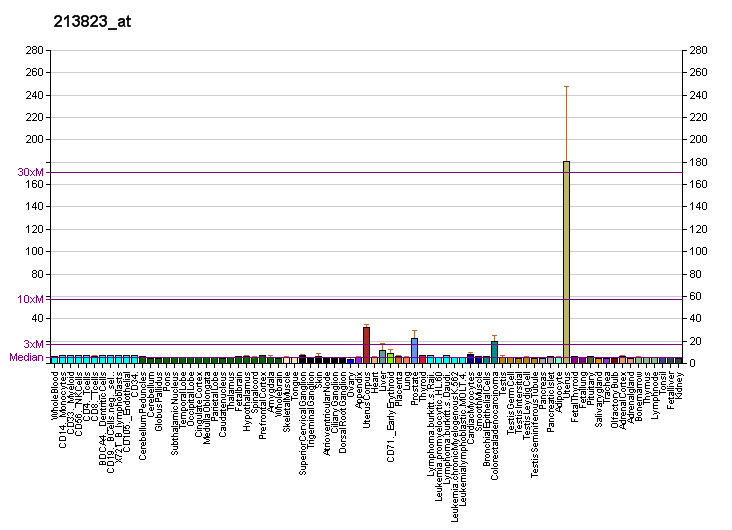
RNA expression pattern
Bgee	Human / Mouse (ortholog); Top expressed in: body of uterus; myometrium; canal of the cervix; stromal cell of endometrium; ectocervix; muscle layer of sigmoid colon; tibial arteries; transverse colon; prostate; urinary bladder / Top expressed in: gastrula; decidua; tail of embryo; uterus; vas deferens; elbow; lumbar subsegment of spinal cord; blastocyst; transitional epithelium of urinary bladder; ankle joint; More reference expression data
BioGPS	More reference expression data
Gene ontology
Molecular function	sequence-specific DNA binding; DNA binding; DNA-binding transcription factor activity, RNA polymerase II-specific
Cellular component	transcription regulator complex; protein-DNA complex; nucleus; nucleoplasm; protein-containing complex
Biological process	cartilage development involved in endochondral bone morphogenesis; skeletal system development; proximal/distal pattern formation; regulation of chondrocyte differentiation; male gonad development; regulation of transcription, DNA-templated; organ induction; anatomical structure morphogenesis; embryonic digit morphogenesis; transcription, DNA-templated; single fertilization; uterus development; multicellular organism development; positive regulation of transcription, DNA-templated; branching involved in ureteric bud morphogenesis; developmental growth; embryonic limb morphogenesis; positive regulation of chondrocyte differentiation; spermatogenesis; positive regulation of cell development; regulation of gene expression; embryonic skeletal joint morphogenesis; metanephros development; mesodermal cell fate specification; dorsal/ventral pattern formation; embryonic forelimb morphogenesis; anterior/posterior pattern specification; bone development; regulation of transcription by RNA polymerase II
Sources:Amigo / QuickGO
Orthologs
Databases	NCBI: entry; OMA: entry
Species	Human	Mouse
Entrez	3207	15396
Ensembl	ENSG00000005073	ENSMUSG00000038210
UniProt	P31270	P31311
RefSeq (mRNA)	NM_005523	NM_010450
RefSeq (protein)	NP_005514	NP_034580
Location (UCSC)	Chr 7: 27.18 – 27.19 Mb	Chr 6: 52.22 – 52.22 Mb
PubMed search
- Wikidata
View/Edit Human	View/Edit Mouse

Homeobox protein Hox-A11 is a protein that in humans is encoded by the HOXA11 gene.

== Function ==
In vertebrates, the genes encoding the class of transcription factors called homeobox genes are found in clusters named A, B, C, and D on four separate chromosomes. Expression of these proteins is spatially and temporally regulated during embryonic development. This gene is part of the A cluster on chromosome 7 and encodes a DNA-binding transcription factor which may regulate gene expression, morphogenesis, and differentiation. This gene is involved in the regulation of uterine development and is required for female fertility. Mutations in this gene can cause radioulnar synostosis with amegakaryocytic thrombocytopenia.

== See also ==
- Homeobox
