= SFPQ =

Protein-coding gene in humans

Identifiers
- Aliases: SFPQ, POMP100, PPP1R140, PSF, splicing factor proline and glutamine rich
- External IDs: OMIM: 605199; MGI: 1918764; GeneCards: SFPQ
Available structures
PDB	Ortholog search: PDBe RCSB
PDB	List of PDB id codes 4WII, 4WIJ, 4WIK

Gene location (Human)
Chr.	Chromosome 1 (human)
Band	1p34.3	Start	35,176,378 bp
Band	1p34.3	End	35,193,446 bp

Gene location (Mouse)
Chr.	Chromosome 4 (mouse)
Band	4 D2.2|4 61.2 cM	Start	127,021,324 bp
Band	4 D2.2|4 61.2 cM	End	127,037,013 bp
RNA expression pattern
Bgee	Human / Mouse (ortholog); Top expressed in: tendon of biceps brachii; ventricular zone; ganglionic eminence; right uterine tube; sural nerve; cerebellar hemisphere; right hemisphere of cerebellum; left ovary; right ovary; sperm / Top expressed in: tail of embryo; genital tubercle; ventricular zone; mandibular prominence; Rostral migratory stream; maxillary prominence; epiblast; abdominal wall; ganglionic eminence; neural layer of retina; More reference expression data
BioGPS	n/a
Gene ontology
Molecular function	RNA polymerase II cis-regulatory region sequence-specific DNA binding; histone deacetylase binding; chromatin binding; transcription cis-regulatory region binding; protein binding; nucleic acid binding; DNA binding; protein homodimerization activity; RNA binding; DNA-binding transcription factor activity, RNA polymerase II-specific; E-box binding
Cellular component	cytoplasm; paraspeckles; nuclear matrix; RNA polymerase II transcription regulator complex; chromatin; nucleus; nucleoplasm; extracellular matrix; nuclear speck; dendrite cytoplasm
Biological process	histone H3 deacetylation; DNA recombination; regulation of transcription, DNA-templated; rhythmic process; negative regulation of circadian rhythm; mRNA processing; negative regulation of transcription by RNA polymerase II; chromosome organization; transcription, DNA-templated; cellular response to DNA damage stimulus; regulation of cell cycle; regulation of circadian rhythm; double-strand break repair via homologous recombination; RNA splicing; positive regulation of oxidative stress-induced intrinsic apoptotic signaling pathway; positive regulation of sister chromatid cohesion; negative regulation of transcription, DNA-templated; alternative mRNA splicing, via spliceosome; DNA repair; positive regulation of transcription by RNA polymerase II; activation of innate immune response; immune system process; innate immune response; dendritic transport of messenger ribonucleoprotein complex
Sources:Amigo / QuickGO
Orthologs
Databases	NCBI: entry; OMA: entry
Species	Human	Mouse
Entrez	6421	71514
Ensembl	ENSG00000116560	ENSMUSG00000028820
UniProt	P23246	Q8VIJ6
RefSeq (mRNA)	NM_005066	NM_023603
RefSeq (protein)	NP_005057	NP_076092
Location (UCSC)	Chr 1: 35.18 – 35.19 Mb	Chr 4: 127.02 – 127.04 Mb
PubMed search
- Wikidata
View/Edit Human	View/Edit Mouse

Splicing factor, proline- and glutamine-rich is a protein that in humans is encoded by the SFPQ gene.

== Interactions ==
SFPQ has been shown to interact with PTBP1, NONO, CDC5L and Ubiquitin C.
