= Rotavirus cis-acting replication element =

Rotavirus cis-acting replication element (CRE)
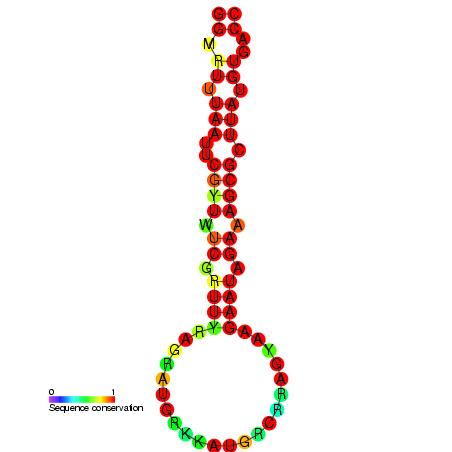
- Predicted secondary structure and sequence conservation of Rota_CRE

Identifiers
- Symbol: Rota_CRE
- Rfam: RF00501

Other data
- RNA type: Cis-reg
- Domain(s): Viruses
- SO: SO:0000233
- PDB structures: PDBe

This family represents a rotavirus cis-acting replication element (CRE) found at the 3'-end of rotavirus mRNAs. The family is thought to promote the synthesis of minus strand RNA to form viral dsRNA.
