= HOTTIP =

Identifiers
- Aliases: HOTTIP, HOXA-AS6, HOXA13-AS1, NCRNA00213, HOXA distal transcript antisense RNA
- External IDs: OMIM: 614060; GeneCards: HOTTIP
Orthologs
Databases	NCBI: entry; OMA: entry
Species	Human	Mouse
Entrez	100316868	n/a
Ensembl	ENSG00000243766	n/a
UniProt	n a	n/a
RefSeq (mRNA)	n/a	n/a
RefSeq (protein)	n/a	n/a
Location (UCSC)	n/a	n/a
PubMed search		n/a
- Wikidata
View/Edit Human

In molecular biology, HOTTIP (HOXA transcript at the distal tip) is a long non-coding RNA. The gene encoding HOTTIP is located at the 5′ tip of the HOXA locus, and coordinates the activation of several of the 5′ HOXA genes. The non-coding RNA is brought into close proximity with the HOXA genes by chromosomal looping. HOTTIP binds to the WDR5 protein, which forms a complex with the histone methyltransferase protein MLL. This targets the WDR5-MLL complex to the HOXA region and results in H3K4 methylation and transcriptional activation of the HOXA locus. More recently, HOTTIP has been shown to play a role in hepatocellular carcinoma (HCC) progression. HOTTIP expression levels predict metastasis and poor disease outcome in HCC patients. HOTTIP has been shown to be transcriptionally regulated by a transcriptional coactivator PSIP1/p52

== See also ==
- H3K4me1
- H3K4me3
