= Skipping-rope RNA motif =

skipping-rope
- Consensus secondary structure and sequence conservation of skipping-rope RNA

Identifiers
- Symbol: skipping-rope
- Rfam: RF02924

Other data
- RNA type: Gene; sRNA
- SO: SO:0005836
- PDB structures: PDBe

The skipping-rope RNA motif is a conserved RNA structure that was discovered by bioinformatics. skipping-rope motif RNAs are found in multiple phyla: Bacillota, Fusobacteriota, Pseudomonadota and Spirochaetota. A skipping-rope RNA was also found in a purified phage, specifically the phage Bacillus phage SPbeta, which infects Bacillus organisms that fit into the phylum Bacillota. Therefore, skipping-rope RNAs likely function, at least sometimes, to perform a function useful to phages.

skipping-rope RNAs likely function in trans as small RNAs, and are often immediately followed on their 3′ ends by Rho-independent transcription terminators. Genes that encode apparently homologous proteins are often located nearby to skipping-rope RNAs. These genes can occur 5′ or 3′ relative to the RNA, and on the same or opposite DNA strand. Occasionally, these proteins match the DUF3800 conserved protein domain, and so skipping-rope RNAs might be an example of DUF3800 RNA motifs. These properties are also similar to the Drum RNA motif.
