= DinG RNA motif =

dinG
- Consensus secondary structure and sequence conservation of dinG RNA

Identifiers
- Symbol: dinG
- Rfam: RF03082

Other data
- RNA type: Gene; sRNA
- SO: SO:0001263
- PDB structures: PDBe

The dinG RNA motif is a conserved RNA structure that was discovered by bioinformatics. dinG motifs are found in Clostridiales.

It is ambiguous whether dinG RNAs function as cis-regulatory elements or whether they operate in trans. Arguing in favor of cis regulation is the fact that the dinG RNAs exist upstream of protein-coding genes. However, in several cases, the dinG RNAs are more than 1 kilobase away from the gene's start codon, which is an unusually long distance for a cis-regulatory element. It was noted that all of these cases with long distances occur in metagenomic sequences, and therefore might relate to problems with sequence assembly rather than biological sequences.

The genes downstream of dinG RNAs are usually predicted to function as helicases, or similar activities. Thus, if dinG RNAs are cis-regulatory elements, they presumably regulate some process related to helicases.
