= DUF2815 RNA motif =

DUF2815
- Consensus secondary structure and sequence conservation of DUF2815 RNA

Identifiers
- Symbol: DUF2815
- Rfam: RF03084

Other data
- RNA type: Gene; sRNA
- SO: SO:0001263
- PDB structures: PDBe

The DUF2815 RNA motif is a conserved RNA structure that was discovered by bioinformatics. As of 2018, the DUF2815 motif has not been identified in any classified organism, but is known through metagenomic sequences isolated from environmental sources.

DUF2815 RNAs occur immediately upstream of genes that encode the DUF2815 conserved protein domain. This domain is associated with phages, and might bind single-stranded DNA. The latter fact suggests a possibility that the DUF2815 actually functions as single-stranded DNA.

The DUF2800 RNA motif is also often present upstream of DUF2815-encoding genes, and might have a related function. Like DUF2800 RNAs, DUF2815 RNAs are often located very near to the immediately downstream gene. Their genetic locations could suggest that they function as cis-regulatory elements, but is also consistent with the view that they function as small RNAs in phages, which often have long transcriptional units consisting of many consecutive genes.
