= OTKONC RNA motif =

OTKONC
- Consensus secondary structure and sequence conservation of OTKONC RNA

Identifiers
- Symbol: OTKONC
- Rfam: RF03053

Other data
- RNA type: Gene; sRNA
- SO: SO:0001263
- PDB structures: PDBe

The One or Two Kilobases Of Non-Coding RNA motif (OTKONC RNA motif) describes a conserved RNA structure that was discovered by bioinformatics. OTKONC motif RNAs have not yet (as of 2018) been found in a classified organism, but are known only in metagenomic sequences.

OTKONC are so-named because they exist between regions of 1–2 kilobases of sequence that are not predicted to contain any protein-coding genes. Such large non-coding regions are uncommon in bacteria, and it is likely that OTKONC RNAs are present in bacteria in view of protein-coding genes that reside farther away from the RNAs. OTKONC RNAs presumably function in trans as small RNAs, and it is unknown what, if anything, their function has to do with the surrounding non-coding regions.
