= Freshwater-1 RNA motif =

Conserved RNA structure

freshwater-1
- Consensus secondary structure and sequence conservation of freshwater-1 RNA

Identifiers
- Symbol: freshwater-1
- Rfam: RF02979

Other data
- RNA type: Gene; sRNA
- SO: SO:0001263
- PDB structures: PDBe

The freshwater-1 RNA motif is a conserved RNA structure that was discovered by bioinformatics. Freshwater-1 motifs are found in metagenomic sequences isolated from bacteria in Freshwater and estuary environments. Freshwater-1 RNAs likely function in trans as small RNAs. Most freshwater-1 RNAs are located between tRNA genes, although no similarity between freshwater-1 RNAs and tRNAs has been observed, as of 2018.
