= SbcC RNA motif =

RNA structure

The sbcC RNA motif is a conserved RNA structure that was discovered by bioinformatics. The sbcC motif has, as of 2018, only been detected in metagenomic sequences, and the identities of organisms that contain these RNAs is unknown.

sbcC motif RNAs occurs upstream of genes that appear to be organized into an operon. Commonly, these operons contain an sbcC gene, whose functional role relates to DNA repair. sbcC genes encode protein that function as ATPases. The upstream location of sbcC motif RNAs could suggest a function as cis-regulatory elements. However, sbcC motif RNAs are, in fact, located in the midst of many genes that might be co-transcribed. Such a genetic arrangement is typical of phage genomes. Thus, although none of the genes exhibited an unambiguous relationship to phages, it is also possible that sbcC motif RNAs function as small RNAs, as part of phages.
