= Saliva-tongue-1 RNA motif =

saliva-tongue-1
- Consensus secondary structure and sequence conservation of saliva-tongue-1 RNA

Identifiers
- Symbol: saliva-tongue-1
- Rfam: RF03107

Other data
- RNA type: Gene; sRNA
- SO: SO:0001263
- PDB structures: PDBe

The saliva-tongue-1 RNA motif is a conserved RNA structure that was discovered by bioinformatics. saliva-tongue-1 motif RNAs are found in metagenomic sequences isolated from human saliva or on the human tongue. So far (as of 2018), these RNAs have not been detected in a classified organism.

saliva-tongue-1 RNAs likely function in trans as small RNAs.
