= Ocean-VII RNA motif =

Ocean-VII
- Consensus secondary structure and sequence conservation of Ocean-VII RNA

Identifiers
- Symbol: Ocean-VII
- Rfam: RF03092

Other data
- RNA type: Gene; sRNA
- SO: SO:0001263
- PDB structures: PDBe

The Ocean-VII RNA motif is a conserved RNA structure that was discovered by bioinformatics. Ocean-VII motifs are found in metagenomic sequences isolated from various marine environments, and are not yet (as of 2018) known in any classified organism. This environmental context is similar to other marine RNAs that were found previously by predominantly bioinformatic or experimental methods.

The contigs in which Ocean-VII RNAs are quite small. Consequently, it is ambiguous whether Ocean-VII RNAs function as cis-regulatory elements or whether they operate in trans as small RNAs.
