= DUF2693-FD RNA motif =

DUF2693-FD
- Consensus secondary structure and sequence conservation of DUF2693-FD RNA

Identifiers
- Symbol: DUF2693-FD
- Rfam: RF02926

Other data
- RNA type: Gene; sRNA
- SO: SO:0001263
- PDB structures: PDBe

The DUF2693-FD RNA motif is a conserved RNA structure that was discovered by bioinformatics. DUF2693-FD RNAs are found in Bacteroides, and occur far downstream (FD), i.e., hundreds of DNA base pairs, of genes that encode proteins containing the DUF2693 conserved protein domain. This domain is annotated as being associated with phages. Another motif predicted by bioinformatics is typically located upstream of DUF2693-encoding genes: the DUF2693 RNA motif. However, no case has been observed in which a DUF2693 RNA and a DUF2693-FD RNA flank the same specific gene.
