= Gut-2 RNA motif =

gut-2
- Consensus secondary structure and sequence conservation of gut-2 RNA

Identifiers
- Symbol: gut-2
- Rfam: RF02990

Other data
- RNA type: Gene; sRNA
- SO: SO:0001263
- PDB structures: PDBe

The gut-2 RNA motif is a conserved RNA structure that was discovered by bioinformatics. gut-2 motif RNAs are found in metagenomic sequences that are derived from animal guts.

It is ambiguous whether gut-2 RNAs function as cis-regulatory elements or whether they operate in trans. Although gut-2 RNAs are often found upstream of protein-coding genes, this does not occur often enough that they were declared as being likely to be cis-regulatory.
