= Throat-1 RNA motif =

throat-1
- Consensus secondary structure and sequence conservation of throat-1 RNA

Identifiers
- Symbol: throat-1
- Rfam: RF03110

Other data
- RNA type: Gene; sRNA
- SO: SO:0001263
- PDB structures: PDBe

The throat-1 RNA motif is a conserved RNA structure that was discovered by bioinformatics. The throat-1 motif has not yet (as of 2018) been found in a classified organism, but rather is known only from metagenomic sequences isolated from the human throat is, more rarely, tongue.

Throat-1 RNAs are only known within metagenomic sequences, and these sequences often consist of short contigs that do not permit detailed analysis of nearby protein-coding genes. However, even with this technical limitation, it is apparent that throat-1 RNAs do not have a strong association with neighboring genes. Therefore, they likely function in trans as small RNAs.
