= Poplar-1 RNA motif =

poplar-1
- Consensus secondary structure and sequence conservation of poplar-1 RNA

Identifiers
- Symbol: poplar-1
- Rfam: RF03041

Other data
- RNA type: Gene; sRNA
- SO: SO:0001263
- PDB structures: PDBe

The poplar-1 RNA motif is a conserved RNA structure that was discovered by bioinformatics. As of 2018, all known examples of the poplar-1 motif are found in metagenomic sequences; no poplar-1 RNA has yet been found in a classified organism. Poplar-1 RNAs were particularly common in a metagenomic sample from decaying yellow poplar tree wood chips.

Poplar-1 RNAs generally occur in sequencing contigs that are relatively small. Therefore, there is not enough information on surrounding genes to be able to determine whether poplar-1 RNAs are likely to function as cis-regulatory elements or whether they more likely operate in trans as small RNAs.
