= Staphylococcus-1 RNA motif =

Staphylococcus-1
- Consensus secondary structure and sequence conservation of Staphylococcus-1 RNA

Identifiers
- Symbol: Staphylococcus-1
- Rfam: RF03112

Other data
- RNA type: Gene; sRNA
- SO: SO:0001263
- PDB structures: PDBe

The Staphylococcus-1 RNA motif is a conserved RNA structure that was discovered by bioinformatics. A Staphylococcus-1 motif RNAs is found in Staphylococcus species CAG-324, which has not yet (as of 2018) been more precisely classified. Other examples of Staphylococcus-1 RNAs are present in metagenomic sequences that do not correspond to a classified organism. It is assumed that the organism corresponding to these sequences are related to the Staphylococcus species.

Most Staphylococcus-1 RNAs are found in the apparent 5′ untranslated regions (5′ UTRs) of genes whose protein products exhibit a borderline similarity to HNH endonucleases. This genetic arrangement could suggest that Staphylococcus-1 RNAs function as cis-regulatory elements. However, one Staphylococcus-1 RNA is not located in a 5′ UTR calls this hypothesis into question, and suggests that the RNAs more likely function as small RNAs.
