= Flavobacterium-1 RNA motif =

Flavobacterium-1
- Consensus secondary structure and sequence conservation of Flavobacterium-1 RNA

Identifiers
- Symbol: Flavobacterium-1
- Rfam: RF02976

Other data
- RNA type: Gene; sRNA
- SO: SO:0001263
- PDB structures: PDBe

The Flavobacterium-1 RNA motif is a conserved RNA structure discovered by bioinformatics. Flavobacterium-1 motif RNAs are found in metagenomic samples from the environment, and only one example of this motif is present in a classified organism. This organism is Flavobacterium sp. SCGC AAA160-P02, which belongs to the bacterial phylum Bacteroidota.

Flavobacterium-1 RNAs likely function in trans as small RNAs, and do not exhibit a clear association with any type of protein-coding gene. Most genes near Flavobacterium-1 RNAs fail to match known conserved protein domains, suggesting that they participate in a poorly studied biological process.
