= Streptomyces-atpC RNA motif =

The Streptomyces-atpC RNA motif is a conserved RNA structure that was discovered by bioinformatics. Streptomyces-atpC motif RNAs are found in organisms classified within the genus Streptomyces.

Streptomyces-atpC motif RNAs likely function as cis-regulatory elements, in view of their positions upstream of protein-coding genes, which encode subunits of ATP synthase. However, it is also possible that they are small RNAs.
