= EGFOA RNA motif =

RNA structure

EGFOA-assoc-1
- Consensus secondary structure and sequence conservation of EGFOA-assoc-1 RNA

Identifiers
- Symbol: EGFOA-assoc-1
- Rfam: RF02970

Other data
- RNA type: Gene; sRNA
- SO: SO:0001263
- PDB structures: PDBe

The Extended-Gap, in Firmicutes and One Actiobacterium RNA motif (EGFOA RNA motif) is a conserved RNA structure that was discovered by bioinformatics. EGFOA motifs are found in Bacillota and one example was detected in Actinomycetota. The EGFOA-assoc-1 and EGFOA-assoc-2 RNA motifs are conserved RNA structures that are often located nearby to EGFOA RNAs, and presumably functions in some related mechanism.

EGFOA RNAs likely function in trans as small RNAs. EGFOA RNAs are located in large regions (at least 1 kilobase) containing no predicted protein-coding genes. Such a large "gap" between protein-coding genes is unusual in bacteria. Since the predicted conserved secondary structure of EGFOA RNAs averages only 113 nucleotides, it is possible that the true structure is much larger, and fills up more of the extended protein-coding gaps in which EGFOA are found. If this hypothesis is correct, the EGFOA-assoc-1 and -2 motifs could represent some additional parts of this hypothesized larger structure. However, it is also possible that the additional non-coding sequence contains other unrecognized functional elements, or that it is the result of a duplication or other process, and has no particular function.
