= Betaproteobacteria-1 RNA motif =

Betaproteobacteria-1
- Consensus secondary structure and sequence conservation of Betaproteobacteria-1 RNA

Identifiers
- Symbol: Betaproteobacteria-1
- Rfam: RF02932

Other data
- RNA type: Gene; sRNA
- SO: SO:0001263
- PDB structures: PDBe

The Betaproteobacteria-1 RNA motif is a conserved RNA structure that was discovered by bioinformatics. Betaproteobacteria-1 motifs are found in betaproteobacteria. Betaproteobacteria-1 RNAs likely function in trans as sRNAs. The motif has three pseudoknots in a moderate size of roughly 120 nucleotides on average.
