= Clostridiales-2 RNA motif =

Clostridiales-2
- Consensus secondary structure and sequence conservation of Clostridiales-2 RNA

Identifiers
- Symbol: Clostridiales-2
- Rfam: RF02937

Other data
- RNA type: Gene; sRNA
- SO: SO:0001263
- PDB structures: PDBe

The Clostridiales-2 RNA motif is a conserved RNA structure that was discovered by bioinformatics. Clostridiales-2 motifs are found in Clostridiales. Clostridiales-2 RNAs likely function in trans as sRNAs, and are often (but not always) preceded and also followed by Rho-independent transcription terminators.
