= FuFi-1 RNA motif =

Conserved RNA structure

FuFi-1
- Consensus secondary structure and sequence conservation of FuFi-1 RNA

Identifiers
- Symbol: FuFi-1
- Rfam: RF02986

Other data
- RNA type: Gene; sRNA
- SO: SO:0001263
- PDB structures: PDBe

The FuFi-1 RNA motif is a conserved RNA structure that was discovered by bioinformatics. Such RNA "motifs" are often the first step to elucidating the biological function of a novel RNA. FuFi-1 motif RNAs are found in Bacillota AND Fusobacteriota.

FuFi-1 RNAs are sometimes located in the vicinity of genes that encode XRE-like proteins, an example of a helix-turn-helix structure. However, XRE-like proteins are very common in bacteria, and therefore it is unclear that this association represents an important biological connection. Also, while the XRE-like genes are often located nearby to the FuFi-1 RNAs, the RNAs are not positioned so that they could be consistently located in the 5' untranslated region of the genes. Therefore, FuFi-1 RNAs likely function in trans as small RNAs. Predicted Rho-independent transcription terminator hairpins occur on the 3' part of the FuFi-1 RNA motif, suggesting that they terminate transcripts containing the RNA motif. These transcription terminators were predicting using the RNie program.
