= Transposase-2 RNA motif =

Transposase-2
- Consensus secondary structure and sequence conservation of Transposase-2 RNA

Identifiers
- Symbol: Transposase-2
- Rfam: RF03015

Other data
- RNA type: Gene; sRNA
- SO: SO:0001263
- PDB structures: PDBe

The Transposase-2 RNA motif is a conserved RNA structure that was discovered by bioinformatics.

These RNAs are usually located nearby to genes that encode transposases, which are the main component of transposons. Many kinds of transposon are found adjacent to inverted repeats, which could be mistaken for simple RNA secondary structures. Therefore, Transposase-2 RNAs could reflect this side effect of transposon replication, and not encode a separate RNA. However, the consistency of the RNA's alignment (e.g., all RNAs have the complete secondary structure, with no truncations) is not typical of transposon-associated repeats. Assuming that Transposase-2 RNAs do function as RNAs, they might function as cis-regulatory elements to regulate the transposase genes, or they might operate in trans as small RNAs that participate in the transposon's biology in some other way.

Transposase-2 motif RNAs are found in two different bacterial phyla: Actinomycetota and Bacillota. Although their presence in two phyla could suggest that they are highly diverged, and have a very old origin, in view of their association with transposons, it is fairly likely that the widespread distribution of these RNAs is a result of relatively recent horizontal gene transfer.
