= EmrB-Lactobacillus RNA motif =

emrB-Lactobacillus
- Consensus secondary structure and sequence conservation of emrB-Lactobacillus RNA

Identifiers
- Symbol: emrB-Lactobacillus
- Rfam: RF02971

Other data
- RNA type: Gene; sRNA
- SO: SO:0001263
- PDB structures: PDBe

The emrB-Lactobacillus RNA motif is a conserved RNA structure that was discovered by bioinformatics. emrB-Lactobacillus motifs are found in bacteria of the genus Lactobacillus.

emrB-Lactobacillus RNAs are generally located in the 5′ untranslated regions of genes that encode EmrB, a kind of transporter. This fact suggests that the RNAs function as cis-regulatory elements. However, two factors call this conclusion into question. First, emrB-Lactobacillus RNAs are also located nearby to their upstream genes. Regulation of an upstream gene is unusual in bacteria. Second, some emrB-Lactobacillus RNAs are located nearby to transposase genes. The presence of these genes could suggest that emrB-Lactobacillus RNAs have a function related to transposons, although it is also consistent with the view that the apparent transposons have merely replicated nearby to the emrB-Lactobacillus RNAs by coincidence, and that there is no functional relationship between the two entities. Thus, it is unknown whether emrB-Lactobacillus RNAs function as cis-regulatory RNAs or as small RNAs.
