= COG3610-DE RNA motif =

COG3610-DE
- Consensus secondary structure and sequence conservation of COG3610-DE RNA

Identifiers
- Symbol: COG3610-DE
- Rfam: RF03066

Other data
- RNA type: Gene; sRNA
- SO: SO:0001263
- PDB structures: PDBe

The COG3610-DE RNA motif is a conserved RNA structure that was discovered by bioinformatics. COG3610-DE motifs are found in the genus Lactobacillales, which is part of the phylum Bacillota.

COG3610-DE RNAs are consistently located downstream of protein-coding genes, such that they are presumably in the 3' untranslated region (3' UTR). This could suggest that they function as cis-regulatory elements, but from the 3' UTR—even though cis regulation from the 5' UTR is much more common in bacteria. It is also possible that COG3610-DE function in trans, and it is a coincidence that they are located downstream of gene transcripts. If COG3610-DE RNAs are cis-regulatory, their biological function is unclear. The biological roles of the upstream genes are largely unknown, yielding few clues as to the function of the RNA. However, the genes are sometimes predicted to have a permease activity.
