= DUF2800 RNA motif =

DUF2800
- Consensus secondary structure and sequence conservation of DUF2800 RNA

Identifiers
- Symbol: DUF2800
- Rfam: RF02960

Other data
- RNA type: Cis-reg
- SO: SO:0005836
- PDB structures: PDBe

The DUF2800 RNA motif is a conserved RNA structure that was discovered by bioinformatics. DUF2800 motif RNAs are found in Bacillota. DUF2800 RNAs are also predicted in the phyla Actinomycetota and Synergistota, although these RNAs are likely the result of recent horizontal gene transfer or conceivably sequence contamination.

The DUF2800 motif usually occurs upstream of operonss that often contain genes encoding a DUF2800 or DUF2815 conserved protein domain. These locations suggest that DUF2800 motif RNAs function as cis-regulatory elements. However, DUF2800 and DUF2815 typical occur within phages, suggesting that DUF2800 motif RNAs are present in prophage DNA. Since phages often contain long stretches of co-transcribed genes, it is possible that the positions of DUF2800 RNAs merely reflect their presence in phages, and not a cis-regulatory function. An additional factor is that the genes immediately upstream of DUF2800 RNAs are often encoding on the opposite strand. Thus, if DUF2800 RNAs are phage-encoded small RNAs, they are often at the beginning of phage operons. Since this is somewhat usually, it was proposed that they more likely function as cis regulators, as this hypothesis is not affected by the orientation of the immediately upstream genes.

Most DUF2800 RNAs are immediately followed by predicted Rho-independent transcription terminator hairpins that overlap the apparent Shine-Dalgarno sequence of the immediately downstream gene. These hairpins could participate in a regulatory function.

The DUF2815 RNA motif is present upstream of genes encoding DUF2815 domains, and might have a related function. However, there is no published report of DUF2815 RNAs upstream of DUF2800-encoding genes.
