= Clostridium-PBP RNA motif =

Clostridium-PBP
- Consensus secondary structure and sequence conservation of Clostridium-PBP RNA

Identifiers
- Symbol: Clostridium-PBP
- Rfam: RF03091

Other data
- RNA type: Gene; sRNA
- SO: SO:0001263
- PDB structures: PDBe

The Clostridium-PBP RNA motif is a conserved RNA structure that was discovered by bioinformatics. Clostridium-PBP motifs are found in organisms in the genus Clostridium.

Structurally, the motif is a hairpin. However, because the sequences determined to match the motif are very closely related, there is limited opportunity to observe covariation, and therefore the predicted structure might be incomplete.

The RNAs are located nearby to the start codons of genes predicted to encode a PBP transporter. The RNAs might therefore regulate these genes as cis-regulatory elements, but it is also possible that they operate in trans.
