= Clostridiales-3 RNA motif =

Clostridiales-3
- Consensus secondary structure and sequence conservation of Clostridiales-3 RNA

Identifiers
- Symbol: Clostridiales-3
- Rfam: RF02942

Other data
- RNA type: Gene; sRNA
- SO: SO:0001263
- PDB structures: PDBe

The Clostridiales-3 RNA motif is a conserved RNA structure that was discovered by bioinformatics. Clostridiales-3 motifs are found in Clostridiales. Clostridiales-3 RNAs likely function in trans as sRNAs and, structurally, largely consist of several hairpins.
