= Actinomyces-1 RNA motif =

Actinomyces-1
- Consensus secondary structure and sequence conservation of Actinomyces-1 RNA

Identifiers
- Symbol: Actinomyces-1
- Rfam: RF02928

Other data
- RNA type: Gene; sRNA
- SO: SO:0001263
- PDB structures: PDBe

The Actinomyces-1 RNA motif is a conserved RNA structure that was discovered by bioinformatics. Actinomyces-1 motifs are found in the genus Actinomyces, in the phylum Actinomycetota. Actinomyces-1 RNAs likely function in trans as sRNAs. In terms of their secondary structure, Actinomyces-1 RNAs consist of a multistem junction with many conserved GA dinucleotides.

Actinomyces-1 RNAs contain a predicted kink turn. This particular example of a kink turn was studied to better understand how kink turn structures relate to their sequences.
