= GntR-DTE RNA motif =

gntR-DTE
- Consensus secondary structure and sequence conservation of gntR-DTE RNA

Identifiers
- Symbol: gntR-DTE
- Rfam: RF02989

Other data
- RNA type: Gene; sRNA
- SO: SO:0001263
- PDB structures: PDBe

The gntR-DTE RNA motif is a conserved RNA structure that was discovered by bioinformatics. gntR-DTE motifs are found in some, but not all species within the genus Streptomyces.

It is ambiguous whether gntR-DTE RNAs function as cis-regulatory elements or whether they operate in trans as small RNAs. Of the 7 known examples of gntR RNAs, 6 are upstream of protein-coding genes, suggesting a cis-regulatory function. However, having more than 10% of the RNAs no upstream of a protein-coding gene would be unusually high for a cis-regulatory RNA. Additionally, the reverse-complement of the RNA would be consistently upstream of protein-coding genes, of which most encode helix-turn-helix proteins of the XRE-like family. However, there is no other evidence to suggest that the RNA is transcribed from the opposite strand.
