= PorB RNA motif =

porB
- Consensus secondary structure and sequence conservation of porB RNA

Identifiers
- Symbol: porB
- Rfam: RF03042

Other data
- RNA type: Gene; sRNA
- SO: SO:0001263
- PDB structures: PDBe

The porB RNA motif is a conserved RNA structure that was discovered by bioinformatics. porB motif RNAs are found in Neisseria.

porB RNAs are found upstream of porB genes, which encode porins, so they likely function as cis-regulatory elements. However it is also possible that the motif operates in trans as small RNAs.
