= Bacilli-1 RNA motif =

Conserved RNA structure

Bacilli-1
- Consensus secondary structure and sequence conservation of Bacilli-1 RNA

Identifiers
- Symbol: Bacilli-1
- Rfam: RF02931

Other data
- RNA type: Gene; sRNA
- SO: SO:0001263
- PDB structures: PDBe

The Bacilli-1 RNA motif is a conserved RNA structure that was discovered by bioinformatics. Bacilli-1 motifs are found in Bacilli. Bacilli-1 RNAs likely function in trans as sRNAs.

The previously published F3 sRNA often occurs nearby to Bacilli-1 RNAs. Therefore, it is possible that these distinct sRNA structures function together or have a related biological function.
