= COG3943 RNA motif =

COG3943
- Consensus secondary structure and sequence conservation of COG3943 RNA

Identifiers
- Symbol: COG3943
- Rfam: RF02941

Other data
- RNA type: Gene; sRNA
- SO: SO:0001263
- PDB structures: PDBe

The COG3943 RNA motif is a conserved RNA structure that was discovered by bioinformatics. COG3943 motifs are found in unknown bacteria whose genomic DNA was isolated from cow rumen. As of 2018, there is no specific, classified organism that is known to contain a COG3943 motif RNA.

It is ambiguous whether COG3943 RNAs function as cis-regulatory elements or whether they operate in trans. They are upstream of multiple different types of protein-coding genes, which would suggest that they function as cis regulators. However, in a few cases, the gene that is downstream of a COG3943 RNA is either located very far away or on the opposite DNA strand, and these cases tend to argue against a cis-regulatory function. Assuming that the RNA is cis regulatory, the genes that would be regulated by the RNAs lack specific functional annotations, which makes it difficult to develop a hypothesis for the RNA's function.
