= GEBRO RNA motif =

GEBRO
- Consensus secondary structure and sequence conservation of GEBRO RNA

Identifiers
- Symbol: GEBRO
- Rfam: RF02988

Other data
- RNA type: Gene; sRNA
- SO: SO:0001263
- PDB structures: PDBe

The GC-Enriched, Between Replication Origins RNA motif (GEBRO RNA motif) is a conserved RNA or single-stranded DNA structure that was discovered by bioinformatics. Although the GEBRO motif was published as an RNA candidate, there is some reason to suspect that it might function as a single-stranded DNA (see below). In terms of secondary structure, RNA and DNA are difficult to distinguish when only sequence information is available. GEBRO motifs are found in some species of Streptococcus.

The GEBRO motif is likely associated with plasmids. It is present in the Streptococcus mutans plasmid pUA140. The GEBRO motif instance is located in a region of the plasmid DNA in which an elevated percentage of nucleotides are G or C, and this region occurs between the predicted single-stranded origin and the predicted double-stranded origin. This positioning suggests that the GEBRO motif functions to facilitate or regulate plasmid replication. The pUA140 plasmid uses rolling circle replication, which means that the plasmid DNA occurs in a single-stranded state during the process of replication. It is possible that the GEBRO motif achieves its function in this single-stranded form, but the GEBRO motif might also function as a small RNA.

Examples of the GEBRO motif are generally followed by predicted Rho-independent transcription terminators. If these predictions are accurate, that could suggest that GEBRO is transcribed as an independent small RNA, but the terminators might have another function or might correspond to incorrect computational predictions.
