= Drum RNA motif =

drum
- Consensus secondary structure and sequence conservation of drum RNA

Identifiers
- Symbol: drum
- Rfam: RF02958

Other data
- RNA type: Gene; sRNA
- SO: SO:0001263
- PDB structures: PDBe

The drum RNA motif is a conserved RNA structure that was discovered by bioinformatics. Drum motifs are found in Bacillota, Bacteroidota, Pseudomonadota, and Spirochaetota, and exhibit multiple highly conserved nucleotide positions, despite their widespread distribution.

Drum RNAs likely function in trans as small RNAs, and are often immediately followed on their 3′ ends by Rho-independent transcription terminators. Genes that encode apparently homologous proteins are often located nearby to drum RNAs. These genes can occur 5′ or 3′ relative to the RNA, and on the same or opposite DNA strand. Occasionally, these proteins match the DUF3800 conserved protein domain, and so drum RNAs might be an example of DUF3800 RNA motifs.

Drum RNAs contain a predicted kink turn. This particular example of a kink turn was studied to better understand how kink turn structures relate to their sequences.
