= Enterococcus-1 RNA motif =

Enterococcus-1
- Consensus secondary structure and sequence conservation of Enterococcus-1 RNA

Identifiers
- Symbol: Enterococcus-1
- Rfam: RF02973

Other data
- RNA type: Gene; sRNA
- SO: SO:0001263
- PDB structures: PDBe

The Enterococcus-1 RNA motif is a conserved RNA structure that was discovered by bioinformatics. Enterococcus-1 motif RNAs are found in bacteria of the genus Enterococcus.

Enterococcus-1 RNAs likely function in trans as small RNAs. Genes nearby to Enterococcus-1 RNAs are often related to phages or plasmids. Also, all four Enterococcus-1 RNAs that are in completed sequences are located in plasmids. Predicted Rho-independent transcription terminators are located roughly 70 nucleotides downstream of Enterococcus-1 RNAs.
