= Rebecca Vega Thurber =

American microbial ecologist and coral reef scientist

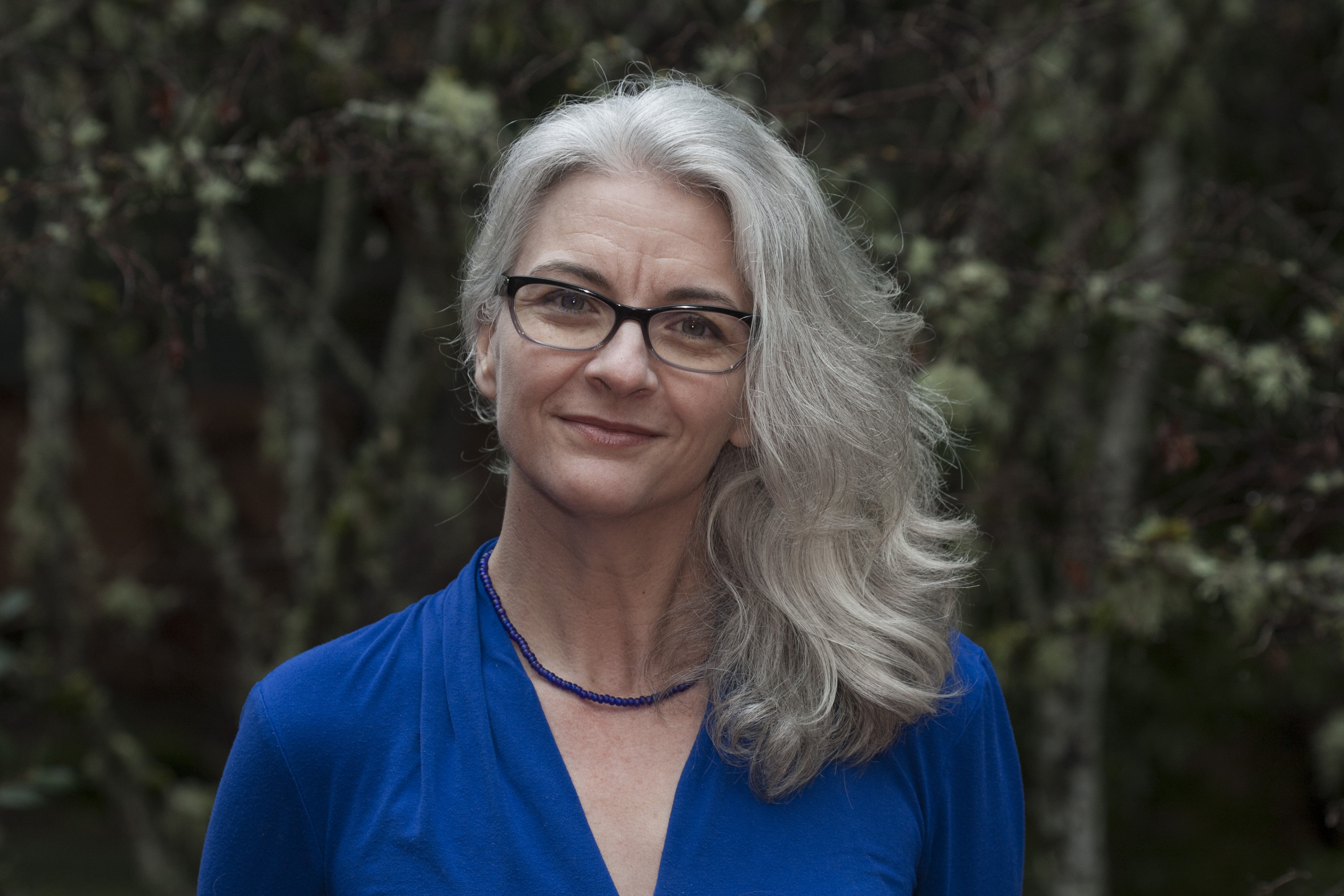
- Born: December 30, 1975 (age 50); Phoenix, AZ, US
- Education: University of California, Santa Cruz; Stanford University
- Scientific career
- Fields: Marine biology and Microbiology
- Workplaces: University of California, Santa Barbara: Oregon State University

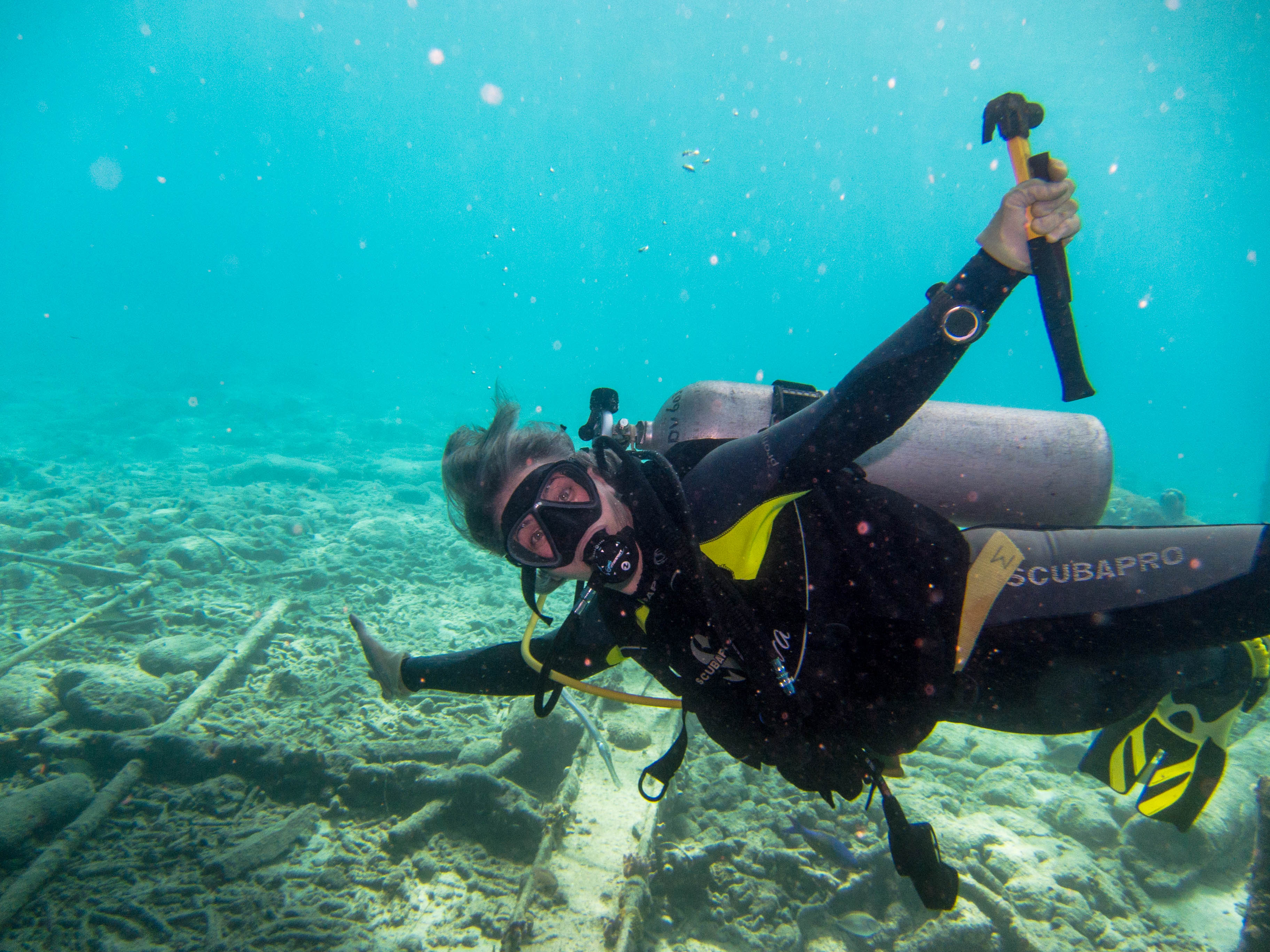
Rebecca Vega Thurber sampling in Curaçao

Rebecca Vega Thurber (born December 30, 1975) is an American microbial ecologist and coral reef scientist. She is a Professor of Ecology, Evolution, and Marine Biology and the Director of the Marine Science Institute at University of California, Santa Barbara. She was named Pernot distinguished chair of microbiology at Oregon State University in 2020. She is a team leader of the Tara Pacific expedition and co-producer of the coral reef documentary Saving Atlantis.

== Scientific career ==
Vega Thurber was awarded a US National Science Foundation Minority Postdoctoral Fellowship to pursue postdoctoral research at San Diego State University under the supervision of Forest Rohwer in coral virology and microbiology. Her first faculty appointment was as an assistant professor in the Department of Biology at Florida International University. She subsequently moved to Oregon State also as an assistant professor in the Department of Microbiology, where is an associate professor holding the Pernot distinguished chair. She is now at UCSB and is the Director of the Marine Science Institute.

== Research ==
Vega Thurber started her research career as a developmental biologist studying apoptosis in early embryogenesis in the model invertebrate organism, the sea urchin Strongylocentrotus purpuratus. It was during her postdoctoral years, when she switched her focus to coral reef science and coral viruses and bacteria in particular. She uncovered that corals contain unique assemblages of viruses that are involved mediating coral reef health. In those early years, Vega Thurber adopted the use genomic and bioinformatic approaches to her research enabling metagenome and microbiome-based inferences. As a faculty member she expanded collaborations with marine ecologists, Deron Burkepile, Erinn Muller among others. Those collaborations led to the discovery of major roles microbial assemblages play in coral reef environments. Her standing as a world expert in coral microbiology led her to be appointed as one of the lead scientists of the Tara Pacific Expedition. Vega Thurber is a member of the NSF Long Term Ecological Research Network in Moorea, Tahiti.

== Mentorship ==
Vega Thurber has mentored 14 Ph.D. students and 11 postdocs. She has mentored dozens of undergraduate students in marine microbiology.

== Awards and professional service ==
- 1999: Alfred P. Sloan Graduate student Fellow.
- 2001: California Sea Grant Graduate Student Fellow.
- 2003: EPA NCER STAR Graduate Student Fellow.
- 2006: U.S. National Science Foundation Minority Postdoctoral Fellow.
- 2014: Oregon State University's Faculty of the Game Award.
- 2016. Oregon State University Impact Award for Outstanding Scholarship.
- 2020: Oregon State University Pernot Distinguished Chair in Microbiology.
- 2024: Director of the Marine Science Institute, University of California Santa Barbara

== Selected publications ==
- Vega Thurber R, Mydlarz L, Brandt M, Harvell D, Weil E, Raymundo L, Willis BL, Langevin S, Tracy AM, Littman R, Kemp KM, Garren M, Lamb J. (2020) Deciphering coral disease dynamics: Integrating host, microbiome, and the changing environment. Frontiers in Ecology and Evolution https://doi.org/10.3389/fevo.2020.575927
- Vega Thurber R, Payet JP, Thurber AR, Correa AMS. (2017) Virus-host interactions and their roles in coral reef health and disease. Nature Reviews Microbiology. 15: 205-216 doi:10.1038/nrmicro.2016.176
- Zaneveld JR, McMinds R, Vega Thurber R. Stress and Stability: Applying the Anna Karenina principle (AKP) to animal microbiomes. (2017) Nature Microbiology 2: 17121 doi:10.1038/nmicrobiol.2017.121
- Zaneveld JR, Burkepile DE, Shantz AA, Pritchard CE, McMinds R£, Payet JP, Welsh RM£, Correa AMS, Lemoine, NP, Rosales SM£, Fuchs C, Maynard JA, Vega Thurber R. (2016) Overfishing and nutrient pollution interact with temperature to disrupt coral reefs down to microbial scales. Nature Communications 7:11833 doi: 10.1038/ncomms11833.
- Vega Thurber R, Burkepile DE, Shantz AA£, Fuchs C, Zaneveld JR, McMinds R. (2014). Chronic nutrient enrichment increases prevalence and severity of coral disease and bleaching. Global Change Biology 20: 544–554 doi: 10.1111/gcb.12450
