= MicroRNA 203a =

MIR203A

Identifiers
- Aliases: MIR203A, MIR203, MIRN203, hsa-mir-203a, miR-203, miRNA203, mir-203a, microRNA 203a
- External IDs: OMIM: 611899; GeneCards: MIR203A; OMA:MIR203A - orthologs

Gene location (Human)
Chr.	Chromosome 14 (human)
Band	14q32.33	Start	104,117,405 bp
Band	14q32.33	End	104,117,514 bp
RNA expression pattern
Bgee	Human / Mouse (ortholog); Top expressed in: ectocervix; skin of leg; left ovary; skin of abdomen; tibial nerve; vagina; body of pancreas; minor salivary glands; monocyte; subcutaneous adipose tissue / n/a; More reference expression data
BioGPS	n/a
Orthologs
Species	Human	Mouse
Entrez	406986	n/a
Ensembl	ENSG00000207568	n/a
UniProt	n a	n/a
RefSeq (mRNA)	n/a	n/a
RefSeq (protein)	n/a	n/a
Location (UCSC)	Chr 14: 104.12 – 104.12 Mb	n/a
PubMed search		n/a
- Wikidata
View/Edit Human

MicroRNA 203a is a small RNA that in humans is encoded by the preMIR203A gene.

== Function ==
microRNAs (miRNAs) are short (20-24 nt) non-coding RNAs that are involved in post-transcriptional regulation of gene expression in multicellular organisms by affecting both the stability and translation of mRNAs. miRNAs are transcribed by RNA polymerase II as part of capped and polyadenylated primary transcripts (pri-miRNAs) that can be either protein-coding or non-coding. The primary transcript is cleaved by the Drosha ribonuclease III enzyme to produce an approximately 70-nt stem-loop precursor miRNA (pre-miRNA), which is further cleaved by the cytoplasmic Dicer ribonuclease to generate the mature miRNA and antisense miRNA star (miRNA*) products. The mature miRNA is incorporated into an RNA-induced silencing complex (RISC), which recognizes target mRNAs through imperfect base pairing with the miRNA and most commonly results in translational inhibition or destabilization of the target mRNA. The RefSeq represents the predicted microRNA stem-loop.
