= SRNA71 =

sRNA71
- Consensus secondary structure and sequence conservation of Staphylococcus sRNA71 small RNA

Identifiers
- Symbol: sRNA71
- Rfam: RF03534

Other data
- RNA type: Gene; sRNA
- GO: GO:0003729
- SO: SO:0000655
- PDB structures: PDBe

sRNA71 is a Bacterial small RNA discovered by RNA-seq analysis of the multiresistant Staphylococcus aureus strain ST239 grown in the presence of antibiotics and found throughout the Staphylococcus genus. It is thought to be a trans-encoded small RNA expressed in diverse conditions and media. The 5’ position is uncertain, this record adds 12 bases to the initial sRNA71 sequence to include additional conserved nucleotides.
