= ARRPOF RNA motif =

ARRPOF
- Consensus secondary structure and sequence conservation of ARRPOF RNA

Identifiers
- Symbol: ARRPOF
- Rfam: RF02933

Other data
- RNA type: Gene; sRNA
- SO: SO:0001263
- PDB structures: PDBe

The ARRPOF RNA motif is a conserved RNA structure that was discovered by bioinformatics.

Most ARRPOF motif examples are found in environmental DNA samples, and the host organism is unknown. The only classified organism with an ARRPOF motif is Fusobacterium nucleatum, and the ARRPOF motif instance is found in the pKH9 plasmid.

It is hypothesized that the ARRPOF motif is associated with plasmid replication. The pKH9 plasmid has a rep gene. Although these genes are known to be necessary for the replication of some plasmids, when this rep gene was eliminated from the pKH9 plasmid, the plasmid was still able to replicate. Another region of the pKH9 plasmid was found that was necessary for replication, and an ARRPOF motif occurs in part of this region.

Because plasmid replication involves DNA molecules that are transiently single-stranded, it was also suggested that it is possible that the ARRPOF motif functions as single-stranded DNA and not as RNA. In terms of secondary structure, RNA and DNA are difficult to distinguish when only sequence information is available.
