= Mya Breitbart =

American biologist

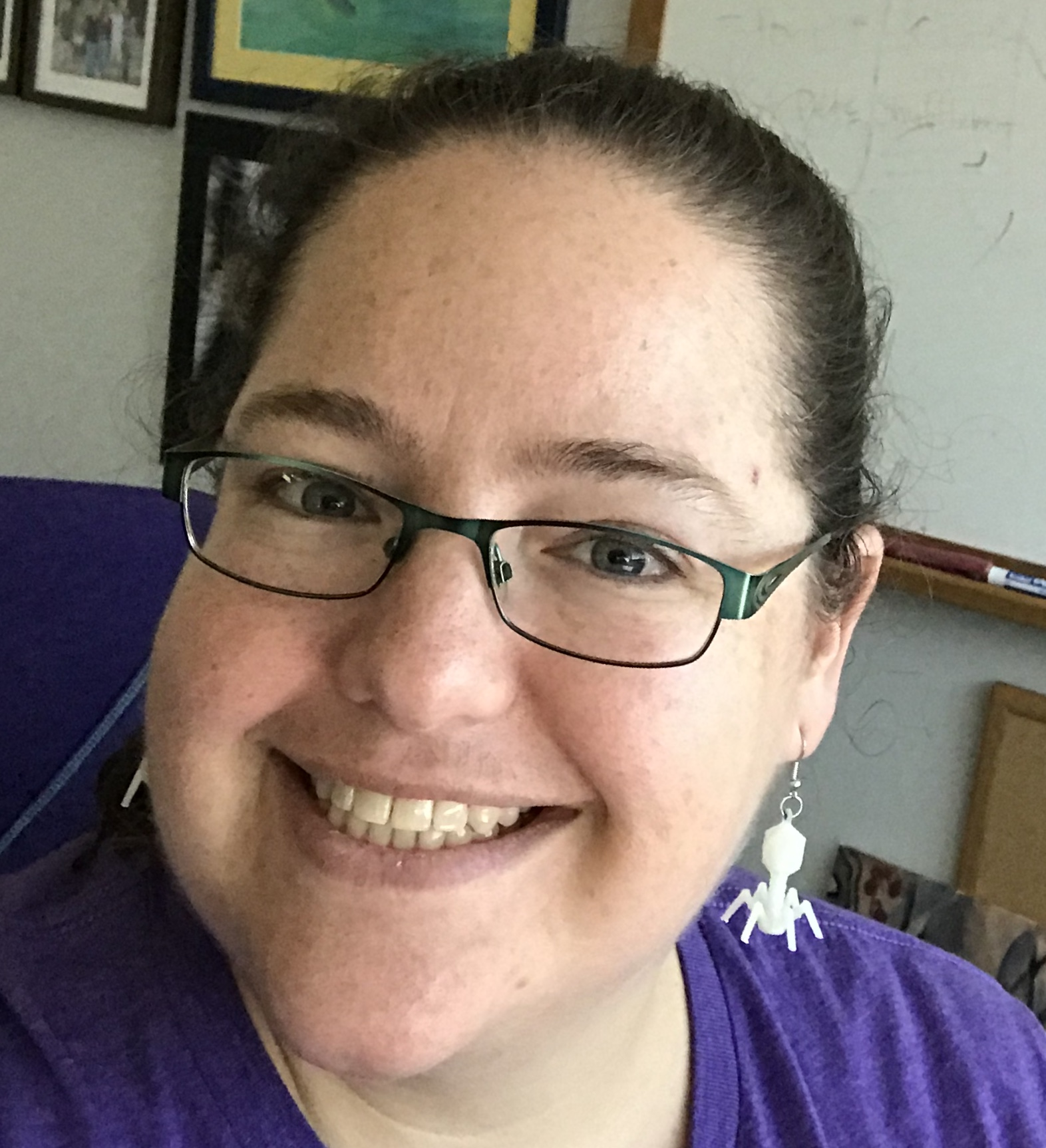
Professor Breitbart

Mya Breitbart is an American biologist and professor of biological oceanography at the University of South Florida's College of Marine Science. She is best known for her contributions to the field of viral metagenomics. Popular Science recognized her because of her approach of not trying to sequence individual viruses or organisms but to sequence everything in a given ecosystem.

== Early life and education ==
Breitbart grew up in South Brunswick, New Jersey and graduated from South Brunswick High School. Her father was a food chemist at Lipton and her mother (a geneticist) set up science laboratories at Breitbart's high school.

She completed a Bachelor of Science degree at the Florida Institute of Technology where she was first introduced to marine viruses and viral ecology. Under the supervision of Forest Rohwer, Breitbart then completed a PhD in cell and molecular biology in 2006.

== Career ==
Breitbart is an environmental virologist at the University of South Florida's College of Marine Science, in Florida, U.S.A. Her research focuses on mapping genomes in an ecosystem i.e. metagenomics. In 2002, instead of isolating each genome individually for sequencing, Breitbart and her colleagues used shotgun sequencing to simultaneously sequence genetic material in marine samples, demonstrating that 200 liters of seawater contains over 5000 different viruses. Later, in 2006, she and her colleagues were among the first to use high-throughput sequencing to investigate environmental samples - specifically, they used pyrosequencing to investigate environmental genome sequences in deep mine microbial ecology. Since then, Breitbart has applied viral metagenomics to better understand viruses present in insects, spiders, and plants.

"Outstanding Scientists" are said to have an h-index (Publication impact) of 40 or above. Breitbart has an h-index of 54, and her research publications have been cited, in 2019, 13,700 times.

As a result of her expertise in viral metagenomics, Breitbart has previously worked with the Kansas City Zoo's veterinarians to investigate the virus which led to an unknown but fatal respiratory illness in four sea lions. In 2013, the Popular Science monthly magazine named Breitbart as one of its annual 'Brilliant Ten', in recognition of her contributions to the field of viral metagenomics.

In 2017, Breitbart was elected a fellow of the American Association for the Advancement of Science in the biological sciences category.

== Selected bibliography ==
- Mya Breitbart, Peter Salamon, Bjarne Andresen, Joseph M Mahaffy, Anca M Segall, David Mead, Farooq Azam, Forest Rohwer. Genomic analysis of uncultured marine viral communities. Proceedings of the National Academy of Sciences. 2002.
- Mya Breitbart, Ian Hewson, Ben Felts, Joseph M Mahaffy, James Nulton, Peter Salamon, Forest Rohwer. Metagenomic analyses of an uncultured viral community from human feces. Journal of Bacteriology. 2003.
- Florent E Angly, Ben Felts, Mya Breitbart, Peter Salamon, Robert A Edwards, Craig Carlson, Amy M Chan, Matthew Haynes, Scott Kelley, Hong Liu, Joseph M Mahaffy, Jennifer E Mueller, Jim Nulton, Robert Olson, Rachel Parsons, Steve Rayhawk, Curtis A Suttle, Forest Rohwer. The marine viromes of four oceanic regions. PLOS biology. 2006.
- Elizabeth A Dinsdale, Robert A Edwards, Dana Hall, Florent Angly, Mya Breitbart, Jennifer M Brulc, Mike Furlan, Christelle Desnues, Matthew Haynes, Linlin Li, Lauren McDaniel, Mary Ann Moran, Karen E Nelson, Christina Nilsson, Robert Olson, John Paul, Beltran Rodriguez Brito, Yijun Ruan, Brandon K Swan, Rick Stevens, David L Valentine, Rebecca Vega Thurber, Linda Wegley, Bryan A White, Forest Rohwer. Functional metagenomic profiling of nine biomes. Nature. 2008.
- Karyna Rosario, Mya Breitbart, Balázs Harrach, Joaquim Segalés, Eric Delwart, Philippe Biagini, Arvind Varsani. Revisiting the taxonomy of the family Circoviridae: establishment of the genus Cyclovirus and removal of the genus Gyrovirus. Archives of Virology. 2017.
