= DUF2693 RNA motif =

DUF2693
- Consensus secondary structure and sequence conservation of DUF2693 RNA

Identifiers
- Symbol: DUF2693
- Rfam: RF02956

Other data
- RNA type: Gene; sRNA
- SO: SO:0001263
- PDB structures: PDBe

The DUF2693 RNA motif is a conserved RNA structure that was discovered by bioinformatics. DUF2693 motif RNAs are found in Porphyromonas.

It is ambiguous whether DUF2693 RNAs function as cis-regulatory elements or whether they operate in trans. DUF2693 RNAs generally occur upstream of apparent operons that contain genes that encode the conserved protein domain DUF2693. This observation would suggest that the RNAs are cis regulators. However, this domain is annotated as being associated with prophages. Because phages often organize their genes into long transcriptional units, it is possible that DUF2693 RNAs function as small RNAs, and are one of many genetic elements transcribed as part of a large phage operon.

Additionally, it is ambiguous on which DNA strand DUF2693 RNAs are encoded, and it is possible that the biological functional element is the reverse complement of the published DUF2693 motif. In both orientations, there are many G-U wobble base pairs and their reverse complements A-C pairs, and both strands have too many A-C pairs to confidently establish the correct strand.
