= AlgC RNA motif =

Conserved RNA structure

algC
- Consensus secondary structure and sequence conservation of algC RNA

Identifiers
- Symbol: algC
- Rfam: RF02929

Other data
- RNA type: Cis-reg
- SO: SO:0005836
- PDB structures: PDBe

The algC RNA motif is a conserved RNA structure that was discovered by bioinformatics. algC motifs are found in Enterobacteriaceae.

algC motif RNAs likely function as cis-regulatory elements, in view of their positions upstream of protein-coding genes. Indeed, most examples of the motif are found upstream of 'algC' genes, which are known to encode phosphomannomutases or phosphoglucomutases. However, in rare examples, it is associated with other genes whose protein products are involved in sugar metabolism. These other genes encode UDP-glucose phosphotransferase and polysaccharide pyruvyl transferase. Thus, the motif might have a regulatory role related to a specific type of sugar-related molecule.
