= AbiF RNA motif =

abiF
- Consensus secondary structure and sequence conservation of abiF RNA

Identifiers
- Symbol: abiF
- Rfam: RF03085

Other data
- RNA type: Gene; sRNA
- SO: SO:0001263
- PDB structures: PDBe

The abiF RNA motif is a conserved RNA structure that was discovered by bioinformatics.
