= CyVA-1 RNA motif =

Molecular structure

CyVA-1
- Consensus secondary structure and sequence conservation of CyVA-1 RNA

Identifiers
- Symbol: CyVA-1
- Rfam: RF02965

Other data
- RNA type: Gene; sRNA
- SO: SO:0001263
- PDB structures: PDBe

The CyVA-1 RNA motif is a conserved RNA structure that was discovered by bioinformatics. CyVA-1 motifs are found in Cyanobacteria, Acidobacteriota, and Verrucomicrobiota. Only one example of the RNA is known in any Acidobacterial organism, and only one CyVA-1 RNA was found in any Verrucomicrobial organism. This could suggest that the RNA is not well-established in these bacterial lineages, or simply reflect the fact that relatively few genome sequences are available for organisms in these phyla. CyVA-1 RNAs likely function in trans as sRNAs, and organisms commonly have 2 or 3 separate copies of the CyVA-1 RNA motif in their genomes.
