= PGM2 =

Identifiers
- Aliases: PGM2, MSTP006, phosphoglucomutase 2
- External IDs: OMIM: 172000; MGI: 97564; HomoloGene: 6693; GeneCards: PGM2; OMA:PGM2 - orthologs
- EC number: 5.4.2.7

Gene location (Human)
Chr.	Chromosome 4 (human)
Band	4p14	Start	37,826,660 bp
Band	4p14	End	37,862,937 bp

Gene location (Mouse)
Chr.	Chromosome 5 (mouse)
Band	5 C3.1|5 32.8 cM	Start	64,092,950 bp
Band	5 C3.1|5 32.8 cM	End	64,128,351 bp
RNA expression pattern
Bgee	Human / Mouse (ortholog); Top expressed in: gingival epithelium; pancreatic epithelial cell; oral cavity; germinal epithelium; parietal pleura; mucosa of pharynx; epithelium of nasopharynx; visceral pleura; human penis; secondary oocyte / Top expressed in: duodenum; jejunum; gastrula; endothelial cell of lymphatic vessel; gastric mucosa; mucous cell of stomach; granulocyte; epithelium of stomach; pyloric antrum; ventricular zone; More reference expression data
BioGPS	n/a
Gene ontology
Molecular function	metal ion binding; isomerase activity; intramolecular transferase activity, phosphotransferases; magnesium ion binding; protein binding; phosphopentomutase activity; phosphoglucomutase activity
Cellular component	extracellular exosome; cytoplasm; cytosol; extracellular region; secretory granule lumen; ficolin-1-rich granule lumen
Biological process	glycogen catabolic process; galactose catabolic process; pentose-phosphate shunt; organic substance metabolic process; deoxyribose phosphate catabolic process; glycogen biosynthetic process; glucose metabolic process; neutrophil degranulation; carbohydrate metabolic process
Sources:Amigo / QuickGO
Orthologs
Species	Human	Mouse
Entrez	55276	66681
Ensembl	ENSG00000169299	ENSMUSG00000029171
UniProt	Q96G03	Q7TSV4
RefSeq (mRNA)	NM_018290	NM_025700; NM_001356964
RefSeq (protein)	NP_060760	NP_079976; NP_001343893
Location (UCSC)	Chr 4: 37.83 – 37.86 Mb	Chr 5: 64.09 – 64.13 Mb
PubMed search
- Wikidata
View/Edit Human	View/Edit Mouse

Phosphoglucomutase-2 is an enzyme that in humans is encoded by the PGM2 gene. PGM2 is a major isozyme in red blood cells.
