= AMPHORA =

- Developers: Martin Wu, Jonathan Eisen et al.
- Stable release: 2.0 / 2013
- Written in: Perl
- Operating system: Linux
- Available in: English
- Type: Bioinformatics
- License: GNU General Public License
- Website: http://wolbachia.biology.virginia.edu/WuLab/Software.html
- Repository: github.com/martinwu/AMPHORA2

AMPHORA ("AutoMated Phylogenomic infeRence Application") is an open-source bioinformatics workflow. AMPHORA2 uses 31 bacterial and 104 archaeal phylogenetic marker genes for inferring phylogenetic information from metagenomic datasets. Most of the marker genes are single copy genes, therefore AMPHORA2 is suitable for inferring the accurate taxonomic composition of bacterial and archaeal communities from metagenomic shotgun sequencing data.

First AMPHORA was used for re-analysis of the Sargasso Sea metagenomic data in 2008, but recently there are more and more metagenomic datasets in the Sequence Read Archive waiting for analysis with AMPHORA2.

== AmphoraNet ==
AmphoraNet is the web server implementation of the AMPHORA2 workflow developed by the PIT Bioinformatics Group. AmphoraNet uses the default options of AMPHORA2.

== AmphoraVizu ==
AmphoraVizu is a web server developed by the PIT Bioinformatics Group which is capable to visualize outputs generated by the AMPHORA2 or its webserver implementation AmphoraNet.
