= Malacidin =

- Structural formula

Identifiers
3D model (JSmol)	Interactive image; A: Interactive image; B: Interactive image
ChEBI	A: CHEBI:140173; B: CHEBI:140174
ChEMBL	A: ChEMBL4525167
DrugBank	A: DB14051
PubChem CID	A: 132274667
- InChI: InChI=1S/C56H88N12O20/c1-25(2)17-13-11-12-14-19-35(69)62-40(29(8)54(83)84)50(79)66-42-31(10)59-47(76)34-21-28(7)24-68(34)53(82)39(27(5)6)65-49(78)41(30(9)55(85)86)63-36(70)23-58-45(74)33(22-37(71)72)61-52(81)43(44(73)56(87)88)67-46(75)32(18-15-16-20-57)60-48(77)38(26(3)4)64-51(42)80/h11-12,14,19,25-34,38-44,73H,13,15-18,20-24,57H2,1-10H3,(H,58,74)(H,59,76)(H,60,77)(H,61,81)(H,62,69)(H,63,70)(H,64,80)(H,65,78)(H,66,79)(H,67,75)(H,71,72)(H,83,84)(H,85,86)(H,87,88)/b12-11-,19-14+/t28-,29?,30?,31?,32+,33+,34-,38-,39+,40+,41-,42+,43+,44?/m0/s1; A: InChI=1S/C56H88N12O20/c1-25(2)17-13-11-12-14-19-35(69)62-40(29(8)54(83)84)50(79)66-42-31(10)59-47(76)34-21-28(7)24-68(34)53(82)39(27(5)6)65-49(78)41(30(9)55(85)86)63-36(70)23-58-45(74)33(22-37(71)72)61-52(81)43(44(73)56(87)88)67-46(75)32(18-15-16-20-57)60-48(77)38(26(3)4)64-51(42)80/h11-12,14,19,25-34,38-44,73H,13,15-18,20-24,57H2,1-10H3,(H,58,74)(H,59,76)(H,60,77)(H,61,81)(H,62,69)(H,63,70)(H,64,80)(H,65,78)(H,66,79)(H,67,75)(H,71,72)(H,83,84)(H,85,86)(H,87,88)/b12-11-,19-14+/t28-,29?,30?,31?,32+,33+,34+,38-,39+,40+,41-,42+,43+,44?/m1/s1 Key: USNOUEMKNKRWQT-ORRWAHHJSA-N; B: InChI=1S/C57H90N12O20/c1-11-28(6)18-14-12-13-15-20-36(70)63-41(30(8)55(84)85)51(80)67-43-32(10)60-48(77)35-22-29(7)25-69(35)54(83)40(27(4)5)66-50(79)42(31(9)56(86)87)64-37(71)24-59-46(75)34(23-38(72)73)62-53(82)44(45(74)57(88)89)68-47(76)33(19-16-17-21-58)61-49(78)39(26(2)3)65-52(43)81/h12-13,15,20,26-35,39-45,74H,11,14,16-19,21-25,58H2,1-10H3,(H,59,75)(H,60,77)(H,61,78)(H,62,82)(H,63,70)(H,64,71)(H,65,81)(H,66,79)(H,67,80)(H,68,76)(H,72,73)(H,84,85)(H,86,87)(H,88,89)/b13-12-,20-15+/t28?,29-,30?,31?,32?,33+,34+,35+,39-,40+,41+,42-,43+,44+,45?/m1/s1 Key: SMTCDPMWINUUKC-AVBBYWJWSA-N
- SMILES: CC(NC([C@@H]1C[C@@H](CN1C([C@H](NC([C@@H](NC(CNC([C@H](NC([C@H](NC([C@H](NC([C@@H](N2)C(C)C)=O)CCCCN)=O)C(C(O)=O)O)=O)CC(O)=O)=O)=O)C(C)C(O)=O)=O)C(C)C)=O)C)=O)[C@@H](NC([C@H](NC(/C=C/C=C\CCC(C)C)=O)C(C)C(O)=O)=O)C2=O; A: C(N[C@@H]1C(N[C@@H](C(N[C@@H](CCCCN)C(N[C@H](C(N[C@H](C(NCC(N[C@@H](C(N[C@H](C(N2[C@H](C(NC1C)=O)C[C@H](C2)C)=O)C(C)C)=O)C(C)C(=O)O)=O)=O)CC(O)=O)=O)C(C(O)=O)O)=O)=O)C(C)C)=O)([C@@H](NC(/C=C/C=C\CCC(C)C)=O)C(C)C(=O)O)=O; B: C(N[C@@H]1C(N[C@@H](C(N[C@@H](CCCCN)C(N[C@H](C(N[C@H](C(NCC(N[C@@H](C(N[C@H](C(N2[C@H](C(NC1C)=O)C[C@H](C2)C)=O)C(C)C)=O)C(C)C(=O)O)=O)=O)CC(O)=O)=O)C(C(O)=O)O)=O)=O)C(C)C)=O)([C@@H](NC(/C=C/C=C\CCC(C)CC)=O)C(C)C(=O)O)=O

Properties
Chemical formula	C_{56}H_{88}N_{12}O_{20}
Molar mass	1249.384 g·mol^{−1}
- Except where otherwise noted, data are given for materials in their standard state (at 25 °C [77 °F], 100 kPa). Infobox references

Malacidins are a class of chemicals made by bacteria found in soil that can kill Gram-positive bacteria. Their activity appears to be dependent on calcium. The discovery of malacidins was published in 2018.

The malacidin family were discovered using a new method of soil microbiome screening that does not require cell culturing. This allowed researchers to identify genetic components necessary to produce the chemical. Malacidin A was shown to kill Staphylococcus aureus and other Gram-positive bacteria.

At the time of publication it was not certain if the discovery would lead to any new antibiotic drugs, because large investments of time and money are required to determine whether any drug is safe and effective.

== Chemical structure ==
Malacidins are macrocycle lipopeptides. The 2018 paper described two chemicals in the malacidin family, differing only by a methylene at their lipid tails. Their peptide cores include four non-proteinogenic amino acids. The name "malacidin" is derived from the abbreviation of metagenomic acidic lipopeptide antibiotic and the suffix -cidin.

== Mechanism of action ==
Malacidins appear to take on their active conformation after they bind to calcium; the calcium-bound molecule then appears to bind to lipid II, a bacterial cell wall precursor molecule, leading to destruction of the cell wall and death of the bacteria. Therefore, they would be a new member of the class of calcium-dependent antibiotics. The discovery of malacidins supported the view that the calcium-dependent antibiotics are a larger class than previously thought.

== History ==
Malacidins were discovered by researchers at Rockefeller University, led by Brad Hover and Sean Brady. The group had been looking into antibiotics related to daptomycin and their calcium-dependent nature, but determined that it would be impractical to culture variations in lab conditions. Instead, the team used a genetics approach that was more scalable. They focused on searching for novel biosynthetic gene clusters (BGCs) – genes that are usually expressed together, that bacteria use to make secondary metabolites. To do this, they extracted DNA from around 2,000 soil samples to build metagenomic libraries that captured the genetic diversity of the environmental microbiome. They then designed degenerate primers to amplify genes likely to be similar to the BGC that make daptomycin by using a polymerase chain reaction (PCR) procedure, sequenced the amplified genes, and then used metagenomics to confirm that these genes were indeed likely to be the kind of BGCs they sought. One of the novel BGCs they found was present in around 19% of the screened soil samples but not readily found in cultured microbial collections, so they took that BGC, put it into other host bacteria, and then isolated and analyzed the secondary metabolites. The work was published in Nature Microbiology in February 2018.

== Research directions ==
The approach of screening the soil for useful compounds using genomics has been done by others, and is likely to continue to be pursued as a method to further explore primary metabolites and secondary metabolites made by microorganisms.

As of February 2018, the malacidins had not been tested on humans. At the time of their discovery it was unknown whether the discovery would lead to any new antibiotic drugs; showing that a potential drug is safe and effective takes years of work and millions of dollars, and the scientists said at the time that they had no plans to try to develop a drug based on the work. In the 2018 paper, malacidins were shown to kill only Gram-positive bacteria and not Gram-negative bacteria. They were, however, able to kill multidrug-resistant pathogens, including bacteria resistant to vancomycin in the laboratory, and methicillin-resistant Staphylococcus aureus (MRSA) skin infections in an animal wound model.

Brady, Hover, and two other authors disclosed in the 2018 paper that they had "competing financial interests, as they are employees or consultants of Lodo Therapeutics." Lodo was founded in 2016 out of Brady's laboratory, to discover new chemicals in nature as starting points for drug discovery.

== See also ==
- Teixobactin
- Friulimicin
