= PGM5 =

Protein-coding gene in the species Homo sapiens

Identifiers
- Aliases: PGM5, PGMRP, phosphoglucomutase 5
- External IDs: OMIM: 600981; MGI: 1925668; HomoloGene: 74881; GeneCards: PGM5; OMA:PGM5 - orthologs

Gene location (Mouse)
Chr.	Chromosome 19 (mouse)
Band	19|19 B	Start	24,660,380 bp
Band	19|19 B	End	24,839,219 bp
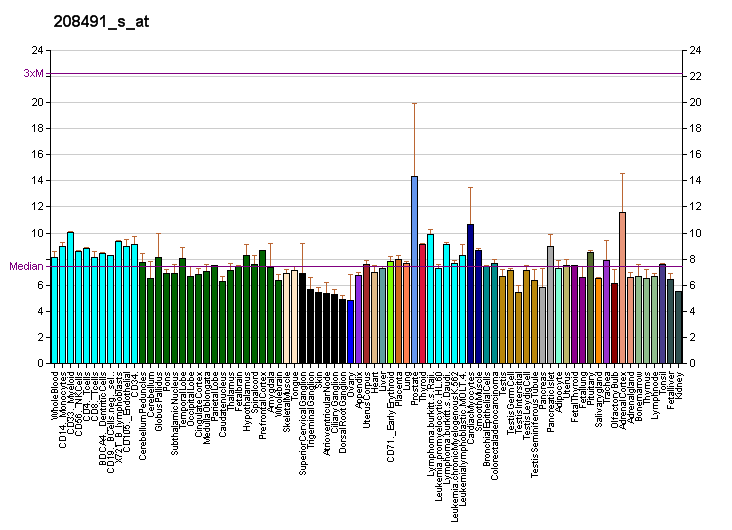
RNA expression pattern
Bgee	Human / Mouse (ortholog); Top expressed in: saphenous vein; seminal vesicula; gastric mucosa; urethra; vena cava; left uterine tube; popliteal artery; right ventricle; nipple; right coronary artery / Top expressed in: interventricular septum; otolith organ; utricle; atrium; vestibular membrane of cochlear duct; myocardium of ventricle; uterus; aorta; ascending aorta; left colon; More reference expression data
BioGPS	More reference expression data
Gene ontology
Molecular function	intramolecular transferase activity, phosphotransferases; structural molecule activity; metal ion binding; phosphoglucomutase activity; magnesium ion binding
Cellular component	cytoplasm; cytosol; intercalated disc; focal adhesion; cell-substrate junction; adherens junction; dystrophin-associated glycoprotein complex; stress fiber; cell junction; spot adherens junction; Z discdkac; cytoplasmic side of plasma membrane; sarcolemma; costamere; cytoskeleton
Biological process	organic substance metabolic process; cell adhesion; glycogen biosynthetic process; glucose metabolic process; galactose catabolic process; carbohydrate metabolic process; striated muscle tissue development; myofibril assembly
Sources:Amigo / QuickGO
Orthologs
Species	Human	Mouse
Entrez	5239	226041
Ensembl	n/a	ENSMUSG00000041731
UniProt	Q15124	Q8BZF8
RefSeq (mRNA)	NM_021965	NM_175013
RefSeq (protein)	NP_068800	NP_778178
Location (UCSC)	n/a	Chr 19: 24.66 – 24.84 Mb
PubMed search
- Wikidata
View/Edit Human	View/Edit Mouse

Phosphoglucomutase-like protein 5 is an enzyme that in humans is encoded by the PGM5 gene.
