= DUF3800 RNA motifs =

DUF3800 RNA motifs refer to conserved RNA structures that were discovered by bioinformatics and are usually located nearby to genes that encode proteins containing the conserved domain called "DUF3800". However, the gene can be located 5′ or 3′ relative to the RNA, and could be on the same or on the opposite DNA strand. This arrangement is typical of RNA and proteins that function as an RNA-protein complex, but could have other explanations. The function of this protein domain is unknown, and no specific biological function has been proposed for the RNA. However, after the detection of the RNA motifs, DUF3800 domains were predicted to be involved with retrons.

Eleven distinct structures were determined that are associated with DUF3800 genes. The DUF3800-I RNA motif was the first to be found, and it occurs in 5 bacterial phyla. Even when the analysis is restricted to RNAs in only one of these phyla, there is still a frequent association with DUF3800 genes. Therefore, the association is likely to relate to a biological association between the RNA and these genes, and is unlikely to have arisen by chance.

Several DUF3800 RNA motifs are found in bacteria, and one occurs in archaea. Many DUF3800 RNA motifs are followed closely by Rho-independent transcription terminator hairpins. Owing to this and the lack of a consistent downstream gene, DUF3800 RNAs likely function in trans as sRNAs.
