= Forest Rohwer =

American biologist

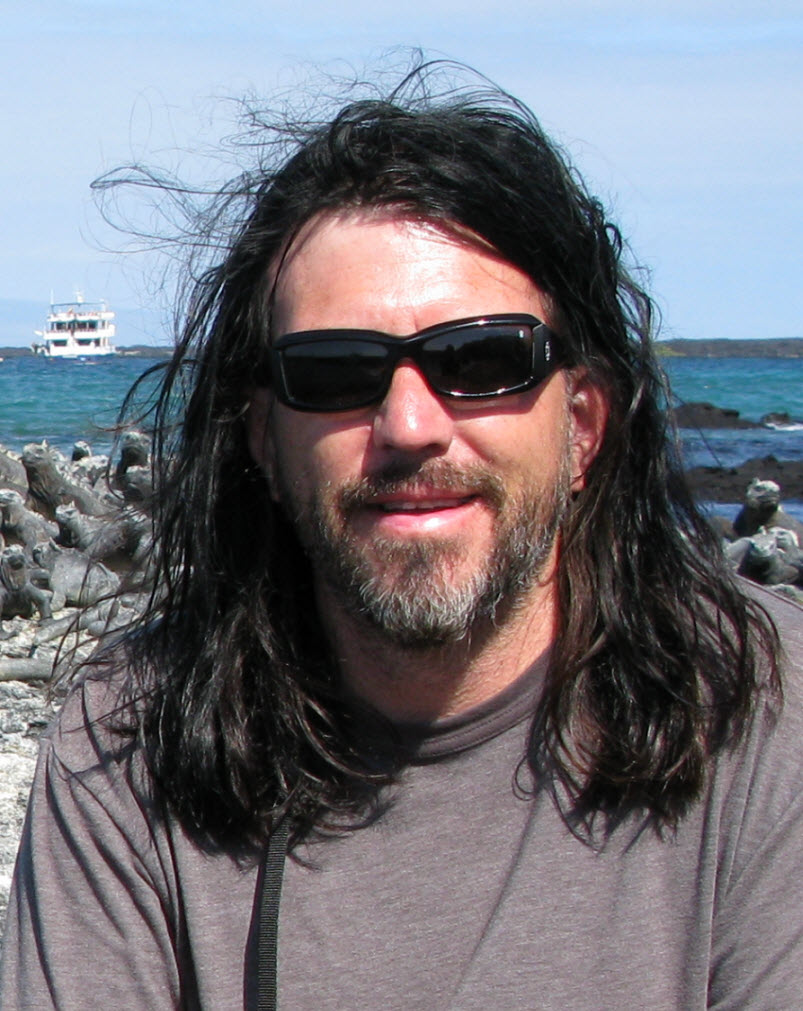
Microbial ecologist Forest Rohwer

Forest Rohwer (born 1969) is an American microbial ecologist and Professor of Biology at San Diego State University. His particular interests include coral reef microbial ecology and viruses as both evolutionary agents and opportunistic pathogens in various environments.

== Education and career ==
Rohwer holds bachelor's degrees with emphases in biology, chemistry, and history from the College of Idaho and earned his doctorate in molecular biology from the San Diego State University/University of California, San Diego Joint Doctoral Program.

== Contributions ==
=== Shotgun metagenomics ===
In 2002, as a research scientist San Diego State University, Rohwer performed the first shotgun metagenome (Breitbart et al. 2002). This method of randomly sequencing DNA from the environment transformed the study of viruses and microbes in the environment and associated with macroorganisms.

=== Viral diversity ===
The first shotgun metagenome, also called virome, showed that there were thousands of viral species per liter of seawater (Breitbart et al. 2002; Angly et al. 2006). Working with Anca Segall, Mya Brietbart, Rob Edwards, and the SDSU Biomath Group, Rohwer performed the first virome studies of corals, soils, sediments and humans (Breitbart et al. 2003, 2005, 2008). Based on this work, he proposed that viruses, and particularly bacteriophage, are the most diverse biological entities on Earth.

=== Phage Proteomic Tree ===
Virome studies showed that most viral diversity was extreme and almost completely unknown. Rob Edwards and Rohwer proposed that a genome-based taxonomy was need to link the metagenomic data to the existing, morphology-based taxonomy. The controversial Phage Proteomic Tree was the resulting system and was featured in Life in Our Phage World (2015).

=== Holobionts ===
Working with Nancy Knowlton at the Scripps Institution of Oceanography, Rohwer showed that reef-building corals harbored hundreds of thousands of unique bacterial species (Rohwer et al. 2002). They proposed that these bacteria, viruses and other microbes were important for coral health and formed an ecological unit called the holobiont. Further, they hypothesized that changing membership of the holobiont was the primary mechanism of adaption to changing environmental conditions.

=== Microbialization of coral reefs ===
In 2005, Rohwer participated in the Northern Line Island expedition headed by Enric Sala and Stuart Sandin. The goal of this research cruise was to determine the effects of human populations on coral reefs. Rohwer performed the first shotgun metagenomes from these islands and proposed that overfishing by humans led to microbialization. Subsequent studies showed microbialization is a global phenomenon and a primary reason for the decline of coral reefs (McDole et al. 2012). This work was featured in Rohwer's book Coral Reef in the Microbial Seas.

=== Bacteriophage Attachment to Mucus (BAM) Immunity ===
While studying corals, Kristen Marhaver and Rohwer noted that bacteriophage, viruses that infect bacteria, were four to five times more abundant than the surrounding seawater. Building on this observation, Jeremy Barr and Rohwer (Barr et al. 2013; 2015) showed that bacteriophage bind to mucus through hypervariable protein domains displayed on the capsid. This effectively concentrates the bacteriophage in the mucus, where they kill bacteria and protect the underlying animal tissue. Rohwer has proposed that this Bacteriophage Attachment to Mucus (BAM) Immunity is the first example and origin of the specific immune response.

=== Piggyback-the-Winner ===
Microbialized coral reefs have relatively high bacteria abundances and reduced bacteriophage abundances. To explain this observation, Rohwer and colleagues (Knowles et al. 2016) proposed that the temperate life cycle was the predominant bacteriophage life cycle at high host abundances. The resulting bacterial lysogens would be protected from other bacteriophage via superinfection exclusion and protists via expression of virulence factors.

== Work ==
He has authored more than 180 scientific papers and book chapters, as well as two popular science book, Coral Reefs in the Microbial Seas (2010) and Life in Our Phage World (2015). He pioneered the use of metagenomics as a means to characterize viral and microbial communities, such as those associated with coral reefs. His field work with colleagues includes expeditions to the Northern Line Islands in 2005 and 2010, and to the Southern Line Islands in 2009.

== Awards ==
Rohwer has been named a Fellow of both the American Association for the Advancement of Science (AAAS) and the Canadian Institute for Advanced Research (CIFAR). In 2008, he received the Young Investigators Award from the International Society of Microbial Ecology (ISME).

== Personal life ==
Growing up in Idaho, Rohwer learned scuba diving in a frigid glacial lake. Later he took that skill to tropical waters where, for more than twenty years, he has been diving and doing research on coral reefs around the world.

== See also ==
- Proteomics
