= Small RNA =

Small, usually non-coding RNA molecule

Small RNA (sRNA) are polymeric RNA molecules that are less than 200 nucleotides in length, and are usually non-coding. RNA silencing is often a function of these molecules, with the most common and well-studied example being RNA interference (RNAi), in which endogenously (from within the organism) expressed microRNA (miRNA) or endogenously/exogenously (from outside the organism) derived small interfering RNA (siRNA) induces the degradation of complementary messenger RNA. Other classes of small RNA have been identified, including piwi-interacting RNA (piRNA) and its subspecies repeat associated small interfering RNA (rasiRNA). Small RNA "is unable to induce RNAi alone, and to accomplish the task it must form the core of the RNA–protein complex termed the RNA-induced silencing complex (RISC), specifically with Argonaute protein".

A simplified overview of RNAi.

Small RNA have been detected or sequenced using a range of techniques, including directly by MicroRNA sequencing on several sequencing platforms, or indirectly through genome sequencing and analysis. Identification of miRNAs has been evaluated in detecting human disease, such as breast cancer. Peripheral blood mononuclear cell (PBMC) miRNA expression has been studied as potential biomarker for different neurological disorders such as Parkinson's disease, Multiple sclerosis. Evaluating small RNA is useful for certain kinds of study because its molecules "do not need to be fragmented prior to library preparation".

== Discovery ==
The first sRNA discovered was in 1984 where MicF was found to regulate the outer cell membrane in E. Coli by inhibiting the production of the protein ompF and ompC. The use of sRNA in regulation of gene expression was found alongside its discovery. It was later discovered to be present across all eukaryotic organisms. In 1998 it was discovered that the sRNA can be transferred between organisms. It was later discovered in 2011 that sRNA are transferred from cell to cell inside an organism as well.

== Types of small RNA ==
- miRNA: microRNA - an RNA involved in RNAi through gene regulation as well as mRNA degradation
- piRNA: Piwi-interacting RNA - an RNA that regulates the germ line, transposons, as well as histones. It also participates in the argonaute complex.
- rasiRNA: repeat-associated siRNAs (a synonym of piRNA)
- qiRNA: QDE-2 interfering RNA - an RNA that regulates gene expression after DNA damage
- scRNA: small-scan RNA - ~28-nt RNAs that have been found in Tetrahymena thermophila and that might be involved in scanning DNA sequences in order to induce genome rearrangement.
- shRNA: Short hairpin RNA - an RNA that acts similarly to miRNA, regulating gene expression via RISC
- siRNA: small interfering RNA - an RNA that regulates both gene expression with RISC and by histone modifications.
- snRNA: small nuclear RNA, also commonly referred to as U-RNA - an RNA integral to the splicosome, that also stabilizes mRNA
- snoRNA: small nucleolar RNA - an RNA regulates the rRNA as well as aiding alternative splicing. It also aids in mRNA degradation.
- srRNA: small rDNA-derived RNA - an RNA involved in multiple signaling pathways as well as the formation of Argonaute protein complexes.
- tasiRNA: trans-acting siRNAs, a somewhat unspecific terms as many small RNAs are trans-acting.
- tiRNA: tRNA-derived stress induced RNA - an RNA that regulates translation by binding to ribosomes.
- tRF: tRNA fragment - an RNA fragment that regulates translation by binding to ribosomes and altering mRNA's caps. It can also combine with Argonaute protein complexes to degrade mRNA.
- ysRNA: Y RNA-derived small RNA - an RNA that aids in initiaion of DNA replication as well as preventing mRNA from degrading.

== In plants ==
The first known function in plants was discovered in mutants of Arabidopsis. Specifically with decline in function mutations for RNA-dependent RNA polymerase and DICER-like production. This impairment actually enhanced Arabidopsis resistance against Heterodera schachtii and Meloidogyne javanica. Similarly, mutants with reduced Argonaute function - ago1-25, ago1-27, ago2-1, and combined mutants with ago1-27 and ago2-1 - had greater resistance to Meloidogyne incognita. Altogether this demonstrates great dependence of nematode parasitism on plants' own small RNAs.
