= Eimear Kenny =

Genetics and translation genomics researcher

Eimear E. Kenny
- Education: Trinity College Dublin (BA, Biochemistry); University of Leeds (MSc, Bioinformatics); Rockefeller University (PhD, Computational Genomics)
- Known for: Co-developer of RFMix (local-ancestry inference software); co-author, Human Pangenome Reference Consortium draft reference in Nature (2023); Founding Director, Institute for Genomic Health
- Awards: American Society of Human Genetics Early-Career Award (2022)
- Scientific career
- Fields: Genomics; Population genetics; Computational biology
- Workplaces: Icahn School of Medicine at Mount Sinai
- Website: labs.icahn.mssm.edu/eimearkennylab/

Eimear E. Kenny is a researcher in population genetics and translation genomics, and is the Founding Director of the Institute for Genomic Health, and Endowed Chair and Professor of Genomic Health at the Icahn School of Medicine at Mount Sinai.

She is known for novel approaches in computational genomics, advancing the study of human genetic variation and its connection to disease risk and diagnosis. Her research has laid the foundation for integrating artificial intelligence (AI) and genomics into precision medicine and routine clinical care. By combining genomics, computer science, and medicine, her work leverages genomic sequencing technologies and machine learning algorithms to uncover insights that improve patient care, accelerate genomic data analysis, and enable the future of AI-driven healthcare. She has led multiple genomics-based clinical trials, applying computational biology and AI in clinical settings to advance genomic medicine and precision healthcare.

== Research ==
A recipient of the Early-Career Award from the American Society of Human Genetics (USA), Kenny, as of 2024, leads a team in genetics, computer science, and medicine, focusing on genetic ancestry, large-scale genomics, clinical trials, and genomic medicine at the Institute for Genomic Health. The lab works to advance understanding of genetic ancestry and its impact on health in order to inform better clinical medicine models. She is recognized for her work to leverage biobanks for translational genomics and her development of new genetic tests an strategies for health care management. In one study, she and her colleagues investigated genetic disorders that might be under-diagnosed due to insufficient data, and found a variant in a collagen gene associated with Steel syndrome. This syndrome caused short stature and bone and joint issues and was thought to be rare. However, the study revealed it is common in individuals with Puerto Rican ancestry. Three of Kenny's genomic medicine clinical trials assessed how to bring new technology, such as digital apps, or information, such as polygenic risk scores, into routine clinical care.

In the 2010s, Kenny was instrumental in several large-scale sequencing studies, including the 1000 Genomes Project, the Exome Sequencing Project, the Genome Sequencing Project, and the Trans-Omics for Precision Medicine. In 2012, she led work that discovered the variant responsible for blond hair in Melanesia, work that was featured in the Smithsonian NHGRI Human Genome Exhibit in Washington, D.C. In 2017, her group was one of the first to demonstrate that polygenic risk scores derived in predominantly European populations have reduced accuracy when applied in populations now widely acknowledged as a major challenge in the field of genomic risk prediction. As of 2024, she is Principal Investigator in many NIH-funded international consortium focused on computational genomics and genomic medicine, including Electronic Medical Records and Genomics, Polygenic Risk Methods in Diverse Populations, and the Human Pangenome Reference Consortium.

In 2023, Kenny played a key role in a groundbreaking advancement in genomics research by helping to map a diverse human pangenome—a major shift from reliance on a single reference genome. Unlike the earlier genetic map, based on one man of mixed European and African ancestry in Buffalo, this new pangenome project captures far greater human genetic diversity. As reported by The Washington Post, Kenny's work demonstrates how a more inclusive human genome can drive discoveries in rare genetic diseases, improve genomic medicine, and accelerate the future of precision healthcare.

Kenny was co-developer and current license holder for Random Forest adMIXture (RFMix), a patented software for inferring continental and sub-continental ancestry at genomic loci.

== Education and career ==
Kenny graduated from Trinity College Dublin with a BA in Biochemistry in 1999 and did a masters in Bioinformatics at Leeds University. She received her PhD in Computational Genomics at Rockefeller University, and did her post-doctoral work in the lab of Dr. Carlos D. Bustamante at Stanford University.

=== Academic appointments ===
As of 2024, at Mount Sinai, she serves as the Endowed Chair and Professor of Genomic Health, Professor at the Department of Medicine and Professor at the Department of Genetics and Genomic Sciences. Since 2018 she has served as the Founding Director of the Institute for Genomic Health, and since 2022, she also serves as the Founding Director of the Center for Translational Genomics. She is also the Director of Translational Research, Division for Genomic Medicine.

Former appointments include Assistant Professor at the Department of Genetics and Genomic Sciences and Member at The Charles Bronfman Institute of Personalized Medicine, both at Mount Sinai. She was also Bioinformatics Programmer at the California Institute of Technology, and research assistant at the Massachusetts Institute of Technology.

== Publications ==
As of 2024, Kenny is an advisor to Cell Genomics. Google Scholar reports 50,623 citations, an h-index of 66 and an i10-index of 130. The five most-cited articles she contributed to are:

- Auton, A; Brooks, LD; Durbin, RM; Garrison, EP; Kang, HM; Korbel, JO; Marchini, JL; McCarthy, S; McVean, GA; Abecasis, GR (2015). "A global reference for human genetic variation". Nature. 526 (7571): 68–74. Bibcode:2015Natur.526...68T. doi:10.1038/nature15393. PMC 4750478. PMID 26432245.. Cited by 14847
- Abecasis, GR; Auton, A; Brooks, LD; DePristo, MA; Durbin, RM; Handsaker, RE; Kang, HM; Marth, GT; McVean, GA (2012). "An integrated map of genetic variation from 1,092 human genomes". Nature. 491 (7422): 56–65. Bibcode:2012Natur.491...56T. doi:10.1038/nature11632. PMC 3498066. PMID 23128226.. Cited by 8287
- Jacob A. Tennessen et al. Evolution and Functional Impact of Rare Coding Variation from Deep Sequencing of Human Exomes.Science337,64–69(2012).DOI:10.1126/science.1219240 Cited by 1886
- Taliun, D.; Harris, D.N.; Kessler, M.D.; et al. (2021). "Sequencing of 53,831 diverse genomes from the NHLBI TOPMed Program". Nature. 590 (7845): 290–299. Bibcode:2021Natur.590..290T. doi:10.1038/s41586-021-03205-y. PMC 7875770. PMID 33568819.. Cited by 1369
- Vilhjálmsson, BJ; et al. (2015). "Modeling Linkage Disequilibrium Increases Accuracy of Polygenic Risk Scores". Am J Hum Genet. 97 (4): 576–92. doi:10.1016/j.ajhg.2015.09.001. PMC 4596916. PMID 26430803.. Cited by 1327
