= The Myth of the One Percent =

The myth of the one percent refers to the 1975 study done by Wilson and King that asserted that human-chimpanzee divergence is about 1%. Humans share a common ancestor with chimpanzees, and the rapid evolution of chimpanzees and humans, along with gorillas and bonobos, has led to difficulties in creating an accurate lineage or tree topology. Chimpanzees and humans were found to be a monophyletic clade, leading to the question of how closely related the two are.

The assertion that human chimpanzee divergence is only 1% and subsequently the two species are 99% genetically identical was widely believed, but is now refuted by modern research that is able to look at entire genomes. It is now believed that the theory of 1% divergence only applies when looking at sequences that are aligned. After using resources not available in 1975, such as sequence data that is now available for multiple species, found multiple other aspects of the genome in humans and chimps that differ. This includes insertions and deletions as well as rearrangements and inversions of the genome. These genomic features help explain the changes that have occurred in humans since we last shared a common ancestor with chimps. The changes include around 35 million base-pair changes, 689 genes gained and 86 lost, the increase in brain mass, as well as the obvious ability to walk on two feet.

With this new information, scientists now believe that there is approximately a 3% divergence due to indels on top of the originally believed 1%. Additionally, gene duplication and loss between the two species differs by 6.4%. There are also differences in the genetic networks and chromosome structure that make it difficult to quantify the relative change.
