= Carlos Bustamante =

Carlos Bustamante may refer to:

- Carlos Bustamante (biophysicist)
- Carlos D. Bustamante, population geneticist
- Carlos Bustamante (TV personality)
- Carlos Bustamante (baseball)
