= Carlos D. Bustamante =

American geneticist

- Education: Harvard University (BA, MS, PhD)
- Awards: MacArthur Fellowship
- Scientific career
- Fields: Biology/Population Genetics
- Workplaces: Stanford University School of Medicine; Cornell University
- Thesis: Maximum Likelihood and Bayesian Methods for Studying Selection Using DNA Sequence Data (2001)
- Doctoral advisor: Daniel Hartl
- Notable students: Eimear Kenny

Carlos D. Bustamante is an American population geneticist. He is also the chief executive officer of the genomics company Galatea Bio, Inc. He is a former professor at Cornell University and Stanford University.

== Early life and education ==
Bustamante is a native of Venezuela who immigrated to the United States at age seven. He attended Harvard University, from which he graduated with a bachelor's and later a PhD in biology, along with an MSc in statistics. His PhD dissertation, accepted at Harvard in 2001, was titled: "Maximum Likelihood and Bayesian Methods for Studying Selection Using DNA Sequence Data."

Bustamante was a postdoctoral fellow at University of Oxford from 2001 to 2002, focusing on mathematical genetics.

== Career ==
From 2002 to 2009, Bustamante was a faculty member at Cornell University. He joined the faculty of Stanford University in 2010, and in 2015 was named the inaugural chair of its Department of Biomedical Data Science. In 2025, he became the inaugural Vice Dean of Research of the University of Oklahoma College of Medicine.

Bustamante is the CEO of Galatea Bio, a genomics company focused on precision health. He co-founded it with Nicholas Katsanis and Alexander Ioannidis.

Bustamante participated in National Institutes of Health initiatives such as the 1000 Genomes Project and ClinGen.

In 2013, Bustamante and coworkers are reported to have found a link between the most recent common ancestor for both males and females in Homo sapiens. He found that there may be a link to the same time period and even the same region for both Y-chromosomal Adam and Mitochondrial Eve. This study rejected the idea that Mitochondrial Eve may have lived well before Y-chromosomal Adam. The study concludes, however, that not all the genetic material comes from these two ancestors and that the two never met and that most of the genome comes from numerous other ancestors.

In 2018, Bustamante carried out DNA testing of United States Senator Elizabeth Warren, from which he concluded that "the vast majority" of Warren's ancestry is European, but that "the results strongly support the existence of an unadmixed Native American ancestor six to ten generations ago."

== Awards and recognition ==
Bustamante was recognized in 2010 with a MacArthur Fellowship, which highlighted his research efforts at "mining DNA sequence data to address fundamental questions about the mechanisms of evolution, the complex origins of human genetic diversity, and patterns of population migration."

In 2007, while at Cornell, Bustamante received a Sloan Research Fellowship from the Alfred P. Sloan Foundation; at the time, his research focused on "developing statistical methods for inference in population and comparative genomics".

== Views ==
Bustamante has said that he does not consider race to be a "meaningful way to characterize people", commenting that, "In a global context there is no model of three, or five, or even 10 human races. There is a broad continuum of genetic variation that is structured, and there are pockets of isolated populations. Three, five, or 10 human races is just not an accurate model; it is far more of a continuum model." He observed, "If I walk from Cape Horn all the way to the top of Finland, every village looks like the village next to it, but at the extremes people are different."

== Publications ==
Bustamante has published over 250 scientific articles, including:

- Nieves-Colón MA, Pestle WJ, Reynolds AW, Llamas B, De La Fuente C, Fowler K, Skerry KM, Crespo-Torres E, Bustamante CD, Stone AC (March 2020) [9 November 2019]. "Ancient DNA Reconstructs the Genetic Legacies of Precontact Puerto Rico Communities" (Research Report). Molecular Biology and Evolution. 37 (3): 611–626. doi:10.1093/molbev/msz267.
- Poznik GD, Henn BM, Yee MC, Sliwerska E, Euskirchen GM, Lin AA, Snyder M, Quintana-Murci L, Kidd JM, Underhill PA, Bustamante CD (August 2, 2013). "Sequencing Y Chromosomes Resolves Discrepancy in Time to Common Ancestor of Males Versus Females" (Research Letter). Science. 341 (6145): 562–565. doi:10.1126/science.1237619. PMC 4032117.
- Bustamante CD, De La Vega FM, Burchard EG (July 13, 2011). "Genomics for the World" (Comment). Nature. 475 (7355). London, England: Springer Nature: 163–165. doi:10.1038/475163a. PMC 3708540.
- Novembre J, Johnson T, Bryc K, Kutalik Z, Boyko AR, Auton A, Indap A, King KS, Bergmann S, Nelson MR, Stephens M, Bustamante CD (August 31, 2008). "Genes Mirror Geography Within Europe" (Research Letter). Nature. 456. London, England: Springer Nature: 98–101.
