= Indel =

Insertions and deletions in a genome

Indel (insertion-deletion) is a molecular biology term for an insertion or deletion of bases in the genome of an organism. Indels of 50 or more bases in length are somewhat arbitrarily classified as structural variants.

In coding regions of the genome, unless the length of an indel is a multiple of 3, it will produce a frameshift mutation. For example, a common microindel which results in a frameshift causes Bloom syndrome in the Jewish or Japanese population. Indels can be contrasted with a point mutation. An indel inserts or deletes nucleotides from a sequence, while a point mutation is a form of substitution that replaces one of the nucleotides without changing the overall number in the DNA. Indels can also be contrasted with tandem-base mutations (TBM), which may result from fundamentally different mechanisms. A TBM is defined as a substitution at adjacent nucleotides (primarily substitutions at two adjacent nucleotides, but substitutions at three adjacent nucleotides have been observed).

Indels, being either insertions, or deletions, can be used as genetic markers in natural populations, especially in phylogenetic studies. It has been shown that genomic regions with multiple indels can also be used for species-identification procedures.

An indel change of a single base pair in the coding part of an mRNA results in a frameshift during mRNA translation that could lead to an inappropriate (premature) stop codon in a different frame. Indels that are not multiples of 3 are particularly uncommon in coding regions but relatively common in non-coding regions. There are approximately 192-280 frameshifting indels in each person. Indels are likely to represent between 16% and 25% of all sequence polymorphisms in humans. In most known genomes, including humans, indel frequency tends to be markedly lower than that of single nucleotide polymorphisms (SNP), except near highly repetitive regions, including homopolymers and microsatellites.

The term "indel" has been co-opted in recent years by genome scientists for use in the sense described above. This is a change from its original use and meaning, which arose from systematics. In systematics, researchers could find differences between sequences, such as from two different species. But it was impossible to infer if one species lost the sequence or the other species gained it. For example, species A has a run of 4 G nucleotides at a locus and species B has 5 G's at the same locus. If the mode of selection is unknown, one can not tell if species A lost one G (a "deletion" event") or species B gained one G (an "insertion" event). When one cannot infer the phylogenetic direction of the sequence change, the sequence change event is referred to as an "indel".

Using passenger-immunoglobulin mouse models, a study found that the most prevalent indel events are the activation-induced cytidine deaminase (AID)-dependent ±1-base pair (bp) indels, which can lead to deleterious outcomes, whereas longer in-frame indels were rare outcomes.

== See also ==
- Insertion (genetics)
- Deletion (genetics)
