= PotC RNA motif =

potC RNA motif
- Consensus secondary structure of potC RNAs

Identifiers
- Symbol: potC RNA
- Rfam: RF01751

Other data
- RNA type: Cis-regulatory element
- PDB structures: PDBe

The potC RNA motif is a conserved RNA structure discovered using bioinformatics. The RNA is detected only in genome sequences derived from DNA that was extracted from uncultivated marine bacteria. Thus, this RNA is present in environmental samples, but not yet found in any cultivated organism. potC RNAs are located in the presumed 5' untranslated regions of genes predicted to encode either membrane transport proteins or peroxiredoxins. Therefore, it was hypothesized that potC RNAs are cis-regulatory elements, but their detailed function is unknown.

A number of other RNAs were identified in the same study, including:

- Lacto-usp RNA motif
- mraW RNA motif
- Ocean-V RNA motif
- psaA RNA motif
- Pseudomon-Rho RNA motif
- rne-II RNA motif
- STAXI RNA motif
- TwoAYGGAY RNA motif
- Whalefall-1 RNA motif
- wcaG RNA motif
- ykkC-yxkD leader
