= Clegg (name) =

Clegg is a given name and an English surname. Notable people with the name include:

== Given name ==
- Clegg Hoyt (1910–1967), American actor

== Surname ==
- Alec Clegg (1909–1986), English educationalist
- Barbara Clegg (1926–2025), British actress and scriptwriter
- Barry Clegg (rugby union) (born 1951), Welsh rugby union player
- Betty Clegg (1926–2009), New Zealand artist
- Bill Clegg, American literary agent and author
- Brian Clegg (writer) (born 1955), English science writer
- Brian Clegg (footballer) (1930–2007), Australian rules footballer
- Charles Clegg (1916–1979), American photographer and historian
- Charles Clegg (footballer) (1850–1937), English footballer and FA official
- Claude Clegg (athlete) (1913–1991), New Zealand javelin thrower
- Claude Clegg, American historian
- Don Clegg (1921–2005), English footballer
- Douglas Clegg (born 1958), American writer
- E. L. G. Clegg (1849–1944), British geologist
- Eileen Clegg, American journalist
- Ellen Clegg (born 1841), American criminal
- Frank Clegg, Canadian business executive
- George Clegg (born 1980), English footballer
- Glen Clegg (1933–2016), Canadian politician
- Harry Clegg (born 1898), English footballer
- Henry Clegg (1850–1920), English cricketer
- Hugh Clegg (physician) (1900–1983), British medical doctor
- Hugh Clegg (academic) (1920–1995), British academic
- James Clegg (minister) (1679–1755), English presbyterian minister and author
- James Clegg (swimmer) (born 1994), British Paralympic swimmer
- James S. Clegg (1933–2024), American biochemist
- Jesse Clegg, South African musician and singer
- Joe Clegg (1869–1902), English footballer
- John Clegg (actor) (1934–2024), British actor
- John Clegg (footballer) (1939–2011), Australian rules footballer
- John Clegg (violinist) (born 1714), Irish violinist
- John Clegg (archaeologist) (1935–2015), British born Australian archaeologist
- Johnny Clegg (1953–2019), British and South African musician and anthropologist
- Jon Clegg (born 1970), British comedian and impressionist
- Jono Clegg (born 1989), British rower
- Judith Clegg, British management consultant
- Justin Clegg (born 1997), English rugby union player
- Lee Clegg (born c. 1969), British Army soldier
- Libby Clegg (born 1990), Scottish Paralympic sprinter
- Max Clegg (born 1997), British speedway rider
- Michael Clegg (footballer) (born 1977), English footballer
- Michael Clegg (naturalist) (1933–1995), British biologist
- Michael T. Clegg (born 1941), American plant geneticist
- Milly Clegg (born 2005), New Zealand footballer
- Mitchell Clegg (born 1990), Australian darts player
- Moses T. Clegg (1876–1918), American bacteriologist
- Nicholas P. Clegg (born 1936), Former managing trustee and chairman
- Nick Clegg, Deputy Prime Minister of the United Kingdom from 2010 to 2015
- Richard Clegg, British physicist
- Robert Clegg Jr. (1954–2023), American politician
- Robert Nii Arday Clegg (born 1976), Ghanaian lawyer and journalist
- Robin Clegg (born 1977), Canadian biathlete
- Roger Clegg, American lawyer
- Roger Clegg (rugby union) (born 1948), Irish international rugby union player
- Ron Clegg (1927-1990), Australian rules footballer and coach
- Rory Clegg (born 1990), English rugby union player
- Samuel Clegg (1781–1861), English civil engineer
- Samuel Clegg (born 1814) (1814–1856), British civil engineer
- Shaun Clegg (born 1992), British weightlifter
- Simon Clegg (born 1959), British sports businessman
- Stephen Clegg (born 1995), British Paralympic swimmer
- Stewart Clegg (born 1947), British-born, Australian sociologist
- Thaddeus von Clegg, German-American clockmaker
- Tom Clegg (actor) (1915–1996), British actor
- Tom Clegg (director) (1934–2016), British TV and film director
- Tony Clegg (footballer) (born 1965), English footballer
- Tony Clegg (businessman) (1937–1995), British businessperson
- Walter Clegg (1920–1994), British politician
- William Clegg (footballer) (1852–1932), English footballer and politician
- William Clegg (cricketer) (1869–1949), English cricketer
- William Henry Clegg (1867–1945), South African businessman

== Fictional characters ==
- Corporal Clegg, in the eponymous rock song by Pink Floyd
- Lelia Clegg, in the Australian TV police drama Blue Heelers
- Les Clegg, in the British TV soap opera Coronation Street
- Maggie Clegg, in do.
- Norman Clegg, in the British TV sitcom Last of the Summer Wine

== See also ==
- Clegg (disambiguation)
- Clegg-Hill, surname
- Captain Clegg (disambiguation)
