= Chlorobi-1 RNA motif =

Chlorobi-1 RNA
- Consensus secondary structure of Chlorobi-1 RNAs

Identifiers
- Symbol: Chlorobi-1
- Rfam: RF01696

Other data
- RNA type: sRNA
- PDB structures: PDBe

The Chlorobi-1 RNA motif is a conserved RNA secondary structure identified by bioinformatics. It is predicted to be used only by Chlorobiota (formerly Chlorobi), a phylum of bacteria. The motif consists of two stem-loops that are followed by an apparent rho-independent transcription terminator. The motif is presumed to function as an independently transcribed non-coding RNA.

A number of other RNAs were identified in the same study, including:

- Bacteroidales-1 RNA motif
- CrcB RNA Motif
- Gut-1 RNA motif
- JUMPstart RNA motif
- Lactis-plasmid RNA motif
- Lacto-usp RNA motif
- MraW RNA motif
- Ocean-V RNA motif
- PsaA RNA motif
- Pseudomon-Rho RNA motif
- Rne-II RNA motif
