= STAXI RNA motif =

STAXI RNA
- Consensus secondary structure of STAXI RNAs

Identifiers
- Symbol: STAXI
- Rfam: RF01728

Other data
- RNA type: sRNA
- Domain: Enterobacteriales
- PDB structures: PDBe

The Ssbp, Topoisomerase, Antirestriction, XerDC Integrase RNA motif (STAXI RNA motif) is a conserved RNA-like structure identified using bioinformatics. STAXI RNAs are located near to genes encoding proteins that interact with DNA (Ssbp, topoisomerase, XerDC integrase) or are associated with such proteins (antirestriction proteins, which inhibit restriction enzymes). This observation raised the possibility that instances of the STAXI motif function as single-stranded DNA molecules, perhaps during DNA replication or DNA repair. On the other hand, STAXI motifs often contain terminal loops conforming to the stable UNCG tetraloop, but the DNA version of this tetraloop (TNCG) is not especially stable. The STAXI motif consists of a simple pseudoknot structure that is repeated two or more times (see diagram).

A number of other RNAs were identified in the same study, including:

- Bacteroidales-1 RNA motif
- Chlorobi-1 RNA motif
- JUMPstart RNA motif
- Lactis-plasmid RNA motif
- Ocean-V RNA motif
- potC RNA motif
- psaA RNA motif
- TwoAYGGAY RNA motif
- ykkC-yxkD leader
