= MRAW =

MRAW may refer to:

- 16S rRNA (cytosine1402-N4)-methyltransferase, an enzyme
- MraW RNA motif
