= Kleg =

Kleg may refer to:

- KLEG-CD, low-power television station in Dallas, Texas
- Cleg or horse-fly, large, agile fly with bloodsucking females
- Clegg (disambiguation)
