= Bacillus-plasmid RNA motif =

Bacillus-plasmid RNA
- Consensus secondary structure of Bacillus-plasmid RNAs

Identifiers
- Symbol: Bacillus-plasmid
- Rfam: RF01691

Other data
- Domain(s): Bacillus, Lactobacillus
- PDB structures: PDBe

The Bacillus-plasmid RNA motif is a predicted conserved RNA structure usually located in plasmids. It is known in species under the genera Bacillus and Lactobacillus. In Bacillus subtilis, it is found upstream of the hypothetical gene ydcS, whose function is unknown.

The fact that the RNA structure is typically found in plasmids suggests that it might be involved in the regulation plasmid copy number by a cis-antisense mechanism in a manner similar to that of R1162-like plasmid antisense RNA. However, the Bacillus-plasmid RNA motif does not appear to be homologous to any such known RNA.
