= Frank Clegg =

Canadian business executive

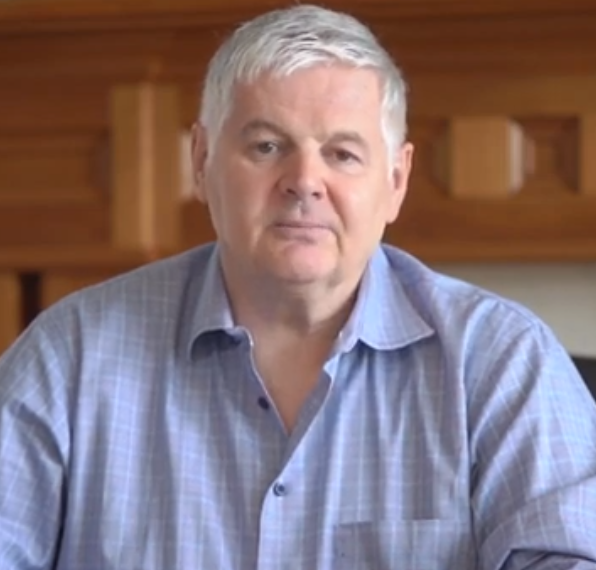
- In a 2019 video
- Born: Bradford, Ontario, Canada
- Education: University of Waterloo
- Occupation: Businessman
- Organization(s): Canadians for Safe Technology (founder & CEO)
- Known for: Former Microsoft Canada president

Frank Clegg is the CEO of Canadians For Safe Technology, and former president of Microsoft Canada. He was president of Microsoft Canada from 1991 to 1996. In 1996, Microsoft made him VP of its Central U.S. and Canada Region. He was reappointed Microsoft Canada president in 2000, until January 2005. He is a board member of the Environmental Health Trust.

== Career ==
=== Early life, IBM, Microsoft ===
He was born in Bradford, Ontario, where he was raised on a farm that raised cattle and pigs. He attended the University of Waterloo. At the University of Waterloo, he earned a degree in mathematics in 1997. After graduating college, Frank Clegg was employed for 12 years at IBM. Clegg joined Microsoft Canada in 1991. Five years later in 1996, he was appointed vice president of the company, and then president of Microsoft Canada in 2000. He departed from the company in 2005.

He was president of Microsoft Canada from 1991 to 1996. In 1996, Microsoft made him VP of its Central U.S. and Canada Region. He was reappointed Microsoft Canada president in 2000, until January 2005.

In 2003, he was tasked by Bill Gates to created the Child Exploitation Tracking System (CETS) at Microsoft. He was also involved with the Canadian National Institute for the Blind (CNIB) to help with the creation of a digital library accessible to the visually impaired. In 2004, the CNIB awarded him the Louis Braille Silver Medal award, after giving him the Dr. Dayton M. Forman Memorial Award the year before.

=== Activist campaigns ===
By 2013, he had taken part in several activist campaigns, and was involved in Citizens for Clean Air (C4CA), aimed at stopping the construction of a power plant in Oakville, Ontario. He also opposed a proposed quarry in Melancthon – both campaigns were successful.

Clegg is the founder and CEO of Canadians for Safe Technology, a not-for-profit, volunteer coalition of citizens and scientists who are concerned about the health risks of wireless technology. C4ST's mission is to educate Canadians and policy makers about what it argues are dangers of exposures to unsafe levels of radiofrequency/microwave radiation from wireless devices and cellular network antennas wireless technology. He was still CEO of Canadians for Safe Technology in 2020.

He is critical of the use of Wi-Fi in schools, and the 5G mobile network. In 2013, he wrote articles for HuffPost about wireless exposure.

== Boards and committees ==
He is currently a board member of the Environmental Health Trust. On May 24, 2007, AMD appointed Clegg to its board of directors, after he was elected by the board. At that time, he was also corporate director and chair of Navantis, which he joined in October 2004, and on the boards of Indigo Books and Music Inc.

== Personal life ==
Clegg resided in Oakville, Canada as of 2004. He is married and has two daughters (as of 2000).
