= Arday =

Arday is a surname of Ghanaian origin. Notable people with the surname include:

- Jason Arday (1985–2026), British academic
- Robert Nii Arday Clegg (born 1976), Ghanaian lawyer, television and radio journalist
- Sam Arday (1945–2017), Ghanaian football coach
- Theophilus Nii Arday Otoo (born 1990), known professionally as Epixode, a Ghanaian reggae–dancehall singer, painter, and creative director
