= EFASI RNA motif =

EFASI
- Consensus secondary structure and sequence conservation of EFASI RNA

Identifiers
- Symbol: EFASI
- Rfam: RF02957

Other data
- RNA type: Gene; sRNA
- SO: SO:0001263
- PDB structures: PDBe

The Enterobactericaea, Frequently Around STAXI and Integrases (EFASI RNA motif) is a conserved RNA structure that was discovered by bioinformatics. EFASI motifs are found in some organisms in the lineage Enterobacteriaceae.

EFASI RNAs likely function in trans as small RNAs. Many EFASI RNAs are found downstream of STAXI RNA motif examples and upstream of integrase-encoding genes, and the distance between the motifs is several hundred base pairs. Although this association likely relates to the function of EFASI RNAs, this function is not yet known.
