= MISL RNA motif =

MISL
- Consensus secondary structure and sequence conservation of MISL RNA

Identifiers
- Symbol: MISL
- Rfam: RF03079

Other data
- RNA type: Gene; sRNA
- SO: SO:0001263
- PDB structures: PDBe

The Mostly Independently Structured, Large RNA motif (MISL RNA motif) is a conserved RNA structure that was discovered by bioinformatics. The MISL motif is found in Verrucomicrobiota.

MISL RNAs likely function in trans as small RNAs, and average roughly 780 nucleotides in length. In comparison to other similarly sized RNA motifs (e.g., the group II intron, the GOLLD RNA motif), the MISL RNA motif exhibits relatively few long-range base pair interactions, such as distant pseudoknots. The large number of hairpin structures in this motif that essentially do not interact with each other is similar to the structure of CRISPR RNAs, except that hairpins in the MISL RNA motif do not share similarities with one another.
