= IMES-5 RNA motif =

IMES-5
- Consensus secondary structure and sequence conservation of IMES-5 RNA

Identifiers
- Symbol: IMES-5
- Rfam: RF02995

Other data
- RNA type: Gene; sRNA
- SO: SO:0001263
- PDB structures: PDBe

The IMES-5 RNA motif is a conserved RNA structure that was discovered by bioinformatics. These RNAs are present in environmental sequences, and have not yet (as of 2018) been identified in a classified organism.

It is ambiguous whether IMES-5 RNAs function as cis-regulatory elements or whether they operate in trans. The RNAs are often found upstream of genes that encode an acyl-tRNA synthetase that is specific for tryptophan. However, this association is not consistent to declare a cis-regulatory function for the RNA, and so it might function as a small RNA.
