= Tony Clegg =

Tony Clegg may refer to:

- Tony Clegg (businessman) (1937–1995), British property entrepreneur
- Tony Clegg (footballer) (born 1965), English footballer
