= Child sexual abuse =

Form of child abuse

Child sexual abuse (CSA) is a form of child abuse defined as any act that involves a child in, or exposes a child to, any type of sexual activity that they are not developmentally prepared for, do not fully comprehend, do not have the capacity to consent to, or which otherwise contravenes laws and societal taboos. Forms of child sexual abuse include engaging in sexual behavior with a child (whether by force, threats, coercion, manipulation, or other fraudulent means), exhibitionism, child grooming, and using a child to produce or exposing a child to child sexual abuse and exploitation material (CSAEM).

CSA is not confined to specific settings; it permeates various institutions and communities. CSA affects children in all socioeconomic levels; across all racial, ethnic, and cultural groups; and in both rural and urban areas. In places where child labor is common, CSA is not restricted to one individual setting, but often passes through a multitude of institutions and communities. This includes but is not limited to schools, homes, and online spaces where adolescents are exposed to abuse and exploitation. Child marriage is one of the main forms of child sexual abuse, with the UNICEF stating that child marriage "represents perhaps the most prevalent form of sexual abuse and exploitation of girls". The effects of child sexual abuse can include depression, post-traumatic stress disorder, anxiety, and physical injury to the child, among other problems. Sexual abuse by a family member is a form of incest and can result in more serious and long-term psychological trauma, especially in the case of parental incest.

Globally, nearly 1 in 8 girls experience sexual abuse before the age of 18. This means that over 370 million girls and women alive as of 2025 have experienced rape or sexual assault before turning 18. Boys and men are also affected, with estimates ranging from 240 to 310 million (about one in eleven) experiencing sexual violence during childhood. The prevalence of CSA varies across regions. Sub-Saharan Africa reports the highest rates, with 22% of girls and women affected, followed by Eastern and South-Eastern Asia.

Most sexual abuse offenders are acquainted with their victims. Approximately 30% are relatives of the child, most often brothers, fathers, uncles, or cousins; approximately 60% are other acquaintances, such as friends of family members, babysitters, or neighbors; and approximately 10% are strangers. Most child sexual abuse is committed by men; studies on female child molesters show that women commit 14% to 40% of offenses reported against boys and 6% of offenses reported against girls.

The word pedophile is commonly applied indiscriminately to anyone who sexually abuses a child, but child sexual offenders are not pedophiles unless they have a strong sexual interest in prepubescent children. Under the law, child sexual abuse is often used as an umbrella term describing criminal and civil offenses in which an adult engages in sexual activity with a minor or exploits a minor for the purpose of sexual gratification. The American Psychological Association states that "children cannot consent to sexual activity with adults" and condemns any such action by an adult: "An adult who engages in sexual activity with a child is performing a criminal and immoral act which never can be considered normal or socially acceptable behavior."

== Effects ==
=== Psychological ===
Child sexual abuse can result in both short-term and long-term harm, including psychopathology in later life. Indicators and effects include depression, anxiety, eating disorders, poor self-esteem, somatization, sleep disturbances, and dissociative and anxiety disorders including post-traumatic stress disorder. While children may exhibit regressive behaviours such as thumb sucking or bedwetting, the strongest indicator of sexual abuse is sexual acting out and inappropriate sexual knowledge and interest. Victims may withdraw from school and social activities and exhibit various learning and behavioural problems including cruelty to animals, conduct disorder, and oppositional defiant disorder (ODD). Teenage pregnancy and risky sexual behaviors may appear in adolescence. Child sexual abuse victims report almost four times as many incidences of self-inflicted harm. Sexual assault among teenagers has been shown to lead to an increase in mental health problems, social exclusion and worse school performance.

A study funded by the US National Institute of Drug Abuse found that "Among more than 1,400 adult females, childhood sexual abuse was associated with increased likelihood of drug dependence, alcohol dependence, and psychiatric disorders. The associations are expressed as odds ratios: for example, women who experienced nongenital sexual abuse in childhood were 2.83 times more likely to develop drug dependence as adults than were women who were not abused."

CSA is associated with experiencing additional victimization in adolescence and adulthood. Correlations have been found between childhood sexual abuse and various adult psychopathologies, including crime and suicide, in addition to alcoholism and drug abuse. Males who were sexually abused as children more frequently appear in the criminal justice system than in a clinical mental health setting. A study comparing middle-aged women who were abused as children with non-abused counterparts found significantly higher health care costs for the former. Intergenerational effects have been noted, with the children of victims of child sexual abuse exhibiting more conduct problems, peer problems, and emotional problems than their peers.

A specific characteristic pattern of symptoms has not been identified, and there are several hypotheses about the causality of these associations.

Studies have found that 51% to 79% of sexually abused children exhibit psychological symptoms. The risk of harm is greater if the abuser is a relative, if the abuse involves intercourse or attempted intercourse, or if threats or force are used. The level of harm may also be affected by various factors such as penetration, duration and frequency of abuse, and use of force. The social stigma of child sexual abuse may compound the psychological harm to children, and adverse outcomes are less likely for abused children who have supportive family environments.

==== Post-traumatic stress disorder ====
Child abuse, including sexual abuse, especially chronic abuse starting at early ages, has been found to be related to the development of high levels of dissociative symptoms, which includes amnesia for abuse memories. When severe sexual abuse (penetration, several perpetrators, lasting more than one year) had occurred, dissociative symptoms were even more prominent. Recent research showed that females with high exposure to child sexual abuse (CSA) develop PTSD symptoms that are associated with poor social functioning, which is also supported by prior research studies. The feeling of being "cut-off" from peers and "emotional numbness" are both results of CSA and highly inhibit proper social functioning. Furthermore, PTSD is associated with higher risk of substance abuse as a result of the "self-medication hypothesis" and the "high-risk and susceptibility hypothesis".

Besides dissociative identity disorder (DID), post-traumatic stress disorder (PTSD), and complex post-traumatic stress disorder (C-PTSD), child sexual abuse survivors may present borderline personality disorder (BPD) and eating disorders such as bulimia nervosa.

==== Research factors ====
Because child sexual abuse often occurs alongside other possibly confounding variables, such as poor family environment and physical abuse, some scholars argue it is important to control for those variables in studies which measure the effects of sexual abuse. In a 1998 review of related literature, Martin and Fleming state "The hypothesis advanced in this paper is that, in most cases, the fundamental damage inflicted by child sexual abuse is due to the child's developing capacities for trust, intimacy, agency and sexuality, and that many of the mental health problems of adult life associated with histories of child sexual abuse are second-order effects." Other studies have found an independent association of child sexual abuse with adverse psychological outcomes.

Kendler et al. (2000) found that most of the relationship between severe forms of child sexual abuse and adult psychopathology in their sample could not be explained by family discord, because the effect size of this association decreased only slightly after they controlled for possible confounding variables. Their examination of a small sample of CSA-discordant twins also supported a causal link between child sexual abuse and adult psychopathology; the CSA-exposed subjects had a consistently higher risk for psychopathologic disorders than their CSA non-exposed twins.

A 1998 meta-analysis by Bruce Rind et al. generated controversy by suggesting that child sexual abuse does not always cause pervasive harm, that girls were more likely to be psychologically harmed than boys, that some college students reported such encounters as positive experiences and that the extent of psychological damage depends on whether or not the child described the encounter as "consensual". The study was criticized for flawed methodology and conclusions. The US Congress condemned the study for its conclusions and for providing material used by pedophile organizations to justify their activities.

=== Physical ===
==== Injury ====
Depending on the age and size of the child, and the degree of force used, child sexual abuse may cause internal lacerations and bleeding. In severe cases, damage to internal organs may occur, which, in some cases, may cause death.

==== Infections ====
Child sexual abuse may cause sexually transmitted infections. Due to a lack of sufficient vaginal fluid, chances of infections can heighten depending on the age and size of the child. Vaginitis has also been reported.

==== Neurological damage ====
Research has shown that traumatic stress, including stress caused by sexual abuse, may cause notable changes in brain functioning and development. Various studies have suggested that severe child sexual abuse may have a deleterious effect on brain development. Ito et al. (1998) found "reversed hemispheric asymmetry and greater left hemisphere coherence in abused subjects;" Teicher et al. (1993) found that an increased likelihood of "ictal temporal lobe epilepsy-like symptoms" in abused subjects; Anderson et al. (2002) recorded abnormal transverse relaxation time in the cerebellar vermis of adults sexually abused in childhood; Teicher et al. (1993) found that child sexual abuse was associated with a reduced corpus callosum area; various studies have found an association of reduced volume of the left hippocampus with child sexual abuse; and Ito et al. (1993) found increased electrophysiological abnormalities in sexually abused children.

Some studies indicate that sexual or physical abuse in children can lead to the overexcitation of an undeveloped limbic system. Teicher et al. (1993) used the "Limbic System Checklist-33" to measure ictal temporal lobe epilepsy-like symptoms in 253 adults. Reports of child sexual abuse were associated with a 49% increase to LSCL-33 scores, 11% higher than the associated increase of self-reported physical abuse. Reports of both physical and sexual abuse were associated with a 113% increase. Male and female victims were similarly affected.

Navalta et al. (2006) found that the self-reported math Scholastic Aptitude Test scores of their sample of women with a history of repeated child sexual abuse were significantly lower than the self-reported math SAT scores of their non-abused sample. Because the abused subjects' verbal SAT scores were high, they hypothesized that the low math SAT scores could "stem from a defect in hemispheric integration." They also found a strong association between short-term memory impairments for all categories tested (verbal, visual, and global) and the duration of the abuse.

== Incest ==
Incest between a child or adolescent and a related adult is known as child incestuous abuse, and has been identified as the most widespread form of child sexual abuse with a highly significant capacity to damage the young person. One researcher stated that more than 70% of abusers are immediate family members or someone very close to the family. Another researcher stated that about 30% of all perpetrators of sexual abuse are related to their victim, 60% of the perpetrators are family acquaintances, like a neighbor, babysitter or friend and 10% of the perpetrators in child sexual abuse cases are strangers. A child sexual abuse offense where the perpetrator is related to the child, either by blood or marriage, is a form of incest described as intrafamilial child sexual abuse.

The most-often reported form of incest is father–daughter and stepfather–stepdaughter incest, with most of the remaining reports consisting of mother/stepmother–daughter/son incest. Father–son incest is reported less often; however, it is not known if the actual prevalence is less or it is under-reported by a greater margin. Similarly, some argue that sibling incest may be as common, or more common, than other types of incest: Goldman and Goldman reported that 57% of incest involved siblings; Finkelhor reported that over 90% of nuclear family incest involved siblings; while Cawson et al. show that sibling incest was reported twice as often as incest perpetrated by fathers/stepfathers.

Prevalence of parental child sexual abuse is difficult to assess due to secrecy and privacy; some estimates state that 20 million Americans have been victimized by parental incest as children.

== Types ==
Child sexual abuse involves a variety of sexual offenses, such as:

- sexual assault – a term defining offenses in which an adult uses a minor for the purpose of sexual gratification; for example, rape (including sodomy), and sexual penetration with an object. US federal law and most US state laws define sexual assault of a minor as any form of penetration of the minor's anus or vagina or oral contact with the minor's genitalia for sexual purposes (excluding medical procedures such as enemas, insertion of suppositories, rectal exams, and gynecological exams). This modern definition contrasts with prior gendered definitions defining rape and sexual assault exclusively as forceful penetration of a minor with a penis.
- sexual exploitation – a term defining offenses in which an adult victimizes a minor for advancement, sexual gratification, or profit; for example, prostituting a child, live streaming sexual abuse, and creating or trafficking in child pornography.
- sextortion – a term defining where children are threatened or blackmailed, most often with the possibility of sharing with the public a nude or sexual images of them, by a person who demands additional sexual content, sexual activity or money from the child.

=== Commercial sexual exploitation ===
Commercial sexual exploitation of children (CSEC) is defined by the Declaration of the First World Congress against Commercial Sexual Exploitation of Children, held in Stockholm in 1996, as "sexual abuse by an adult accompanied by remuneration in cash or in kind to the child or third person(s)." CSEC usually takes the form of child prostitution or child pornography, and is often facilitated by child sex tourism. CSEC is particularly a problem in developing countries of Asia. In recent years, new innovations in technology have facilitated the trade of Internet child pornography.

In the United Kingdom, the term child sexual exploitation covers any form of sexual abuse which includes an exchange of a resource for sexual activity with a child. Prior to 2009, the term commonly used to describe child sexual exploitation was child prostitution. The term child sexual exploitation first appeared in government guidance in 2009 as part of an attempt to promote an understanding that children involved in exploitation were victims of abuse rather than criminals. Because early definitions of child sexual exploitation were created to foster a move away from use of the term child prostitution, the concept of exchange, which made child sexual exploitation different from child sexual abuse, referred to financial gain only. However, in the years since the birth of the concept of child sexual exploitation, the notion of exchange has been widened to include other types of gain, including love, acquisition of status and protection from harm.

== Disclosure ==
Children who received supportive responses following disclosure had less traumatic symptoms and were abused for a shorter period of time than children who did not receive support. In general, studies have found that children need support and stress-reducing resources after disclosure of sexual abuse. Negative social reactions to disclosure have been found to be harmful to the survivor's well-being. One study reported that children who received a bad reaction from the first person they told, especially if the person was a close family member, had worse scores as adults on general trauma symptoms, post traumatic stress disorder symptoms, and dissociation. Another study found that in most cases when children did disclose abuse, the person they talked to did not respond effectively, blamed or rejected the child, and took little or no action to stop the abuse. Non-validating and otherwise non-supportive responses to disclosure by the child's primary attachment figure may indicate a relational disturbance predating the sexual abuse that may have been a risk factor for the abuse, and which can remain a risk factor for its psychological consequences.

The American Academy of Child and Adolescent Psychiatry provides guidelines for what to say to the victim and what to do following the disclosure. As Don Brown has indicated: "A minimization of the trauma and its effects is commonly injected into the picture by parental caregivers to shelter and calm the child. It has been commonly assumed that focusing on children's issues too long will negatively impact their recovery. Therefore, the parental caregiver teaches the child to mask his or her issues."

In many jurisdictions, abuse that is suspected, not necessarily proven, requires reporting to child protection agencies, such as the Child Protection Services in the United States. Recommendations for healthcare workers, such as primary care providers and nurses, who are often suited to encounter suspected abuse are advised to firstly determine the child's immediate need for safety. A private environment away from suspected abusers is desired for interviewing and examining. Leading statements that can distort the story are avoided. As disclosing abuse can be distressing and sometimes even shameful, reassuring the child that he or she has done the right thing by telling and that they are not bad and that the abuse was not their fault helps in disclosing more information. Anatomically correct dolls are sometimes used to help explain what happened. However, some researchers have found that the use of these dolls may be too graphic and overstimulating, which may lead children that were not abused to behave as though they were sexually abused. For the suspected abusers, it is also recommended to use a nonjudgmental, nonthreatening attitude towards them and to withhold expressing shock, in order to help disclose information.

== Treatment ==
The initial approach to treating a person who has been a victim of sexual abuse is dependent upon several important factors:

- Age at the time of presentation
- Circumstances of presentation for treatment
- Co-morbid conditions

The goal of treatment is not only to treat current mental health issues, and trauma related symptoms, but also to prevent future ones.

=== Children and adolescents ===
Children often present for treatment in one of several circumstances, including criminal investigations, custody battles, problematic behaviors, and referrals from child welfare agencies.

The three major modalities for therapy with children and adolescents are family therapy, group therapy, and individual therapy. Which course is used depends on a variety of factors that must be assessed on a case-by-case basis. For instance, treatment of young children generally requires strong parental involvement and can benefit from family therapy. Adolescents tend to be more independent; they can benefit from individual or group therapy. The modality also shifts during the course of treatment; for example, group therapy is rarely used in the initial stages, as the subject matter is very personal and/or embarrassing. In a 2012 systematic review, cognitive behavior therapy showed potential in treating the adverse consequences of child sexual abuse.

Major factors that affect both the pathology and response to treatment include the type and severity of the sexual act, its frequency, the age at which it occurred, and the child's family of origin. Roland C. Summit, a medical doctor, defined the different stages the victims of child sexual abuse go through, called child sexual abuse accommodation syndrome. He suggested that children who are victims of sexual abuse display a range of symptoms that include secrecy, helplessness, entrapment, accommodation, delayed and conflicted disclosure and recantation.

=== Adults ===
Adults who have been sexually abused as children often present for treatment with a secondary mental health issue, which can include substance abuse, eating disorders, personality disorders, depression, and conflict in romantic or interpersonal relationships.

Generally, the approach is to focus on the present problem rather than the abuse itself. Treatment is highly varied and depends on the person's specific issues. For instance, a person with a history of sexual abuse and severe depression would be treated for depression. However, there is often an emphasis on cognitive restructuring due to the deep-seated nature of the trauma. Some newer techniques such as eye movement desensitization and reprocessing (EMDR) have been shown to be effective.

Although there is no known cure for pedophilia, there are a number of treatments for pedophiles and child sexual abusers. Some of the treatments focus on attempting to change the sexual preference of pedophiles, while others focus on keeping pedophiles from committing child sexual abuse or child sexual abusers from committing child sexual abuse again. Cognitive behavioral therapy (CBT), for example, aims to reduce attitudes, beliefs, and behaviors that may increase the likelihood of sexual offenses against children. Its content varies widely between therapists, but a typical program might involve training in self-control, social competence and empathy, and use cognitive restructuring to change views on sex with children. The most common form of this therapy is relapse prevention, where the patient is taught to identify and respond to potentially risky situations based on principles used for treating addictions.

The evidence for cognitive behavioral therapy is mixed. A 2012 Cochrane Review of randomized trials found that CBT had no effect on risk of reoffending for contact sex offenders. Meta-analyses in 2002 and 2005, which included both randomized and non-randomized studies, concluded that CBT reduced recidivism. There is debate over whether non-randomized studies should be considered informative. More research is needed to understand the effect of CBT on recidivism.

== Prevention ==
Child sexual abuse prevention programmes were developed in the United States of America during the 1970s. Some programme are delivered to children and can include one-to-one work and group work. Programmes delivered to parents were developed in the 1980s and took the form of one-off meetings that were generally two to three hours long. In the last 15 years, web-based programmes have been developed. School-based education programs were evaluated in 2015 by Cochrane that demonstrated improvements in protective behaviors and knowledge among children. The American CDC lists that improving surveillance systems can help monitor and prevent child abuse.

== Offenders ==
=== Demographics ===
Offenders are more likely to be relatives or acquaintances of their victim than strangers. A 2006–07 Idaho study of 430 cases found that 82% of juvenile sex offenders were known to the victims (acquaintances 46% or relatives 36%). In the Netherlands only 7% of offenders were strangers to the victims.

More offenders are male than female, though the percentage varies between studies. In the Netherlands 3% of the convicted perpetrators were women. A 2004 synthesis of studies of sexual misconduct in US schools showed estimates between 4% and 43% of offenders being female. Gender roles, gendered under-reporting and sentencing disparity cause an underestimate in the share of female perpetrators according to a 2003 study. A 2022 review found female perpetrators as under-reported and under-researched.

In the Netherlands 14.58% of the victims were boys. According to research conducted in Australia by Kelly Richards on child sexual abuse, 35.1% of female victims were abused by another male relative and 16.4% of male victims were abused by another male relative.

In Netherlands one in six perpetrators was underage. In U.S. schools, educators who offend range in age from "21 to 75 years old, with an average age of 28".

=== Typology ===
Early research in the 1970s and 1980s began to classify offenders based on their motivations and traits. Groth and Birnbaum (1978) categorized child sexual offenders into two groups, "fixated" and "regressed". Fixated were described as having a primary attraction to children, whereas regressed had largely maintained relationships with other adults, and were even married. This study also showed that adult sexual orientation was not related to the sex of the victim targeted, e.g. men who molested boys often had adult relationships with women.

Later work (Holmes and Holmes, 2002) expanded on the types of offenders and their psychological profiles. They are divided as follows:

- Situational – does not prefer children, but offend under certain conditions.
  - Regressed – Typically has relationships with adults, but a stressor causes them to seek children as a substitute.
  - Morally indiscriminate – All-around sexual deviant, who may commit other sexual offenses unrelated to children.
  - Naive/Inadequate – Often mentally disabled in some way, finds children less threatening.
- Preferential – has true sexual interest in children.
  - Mysoped – Sadistic and violent, target strangers more often than acquaintances.
  - Fixated – Little or no activity with own age, described as an "overgrown child".

=== Causal factors ===
Causal factors of child sex offenders are not known conclusively. The experience of sexual abuse as a child was previously thought to be a strong risk factor, but research does not show a causal relationship, as the vast majority of sexually abused children do not grow up to be adult offenders, nor do the majority of adult offenders report childhood sexual abuse. The US Government Accountability Office concluded, "the existence of a cycle of sexual abuse was not established." Before 1996, there was greater belief in the theory of a "cycle of violence", because most of the research done was retrospective—abusers were asked if they had experienced past abuse. Even the majority of studies found that most adult sex offenders said they had not been sexually abused during childhood, but studies varied in terms of their estimates of the percentage of such offenders who had been abused, from 0 to 79 percent. More recent prospective longitudinal research—studying children with documented cases of sexual abuse over time to determine what percentage become adult offenders—has demonstrated that the cycle of violence theory is not an adequate explanation for why people molest children.

Offenders may use cognitive distortions to facilitate their offenses, such as minimization of the abuse, victim blaming, and excuses.

=== Treatment ===
==== Cognitive behavioral therapy ====
Cognitive behavioral therapy (CBT) aims to reduce attitudes, beliefs, and behaviors that may increase the likelihood of sexual offenses against children. Its content varies widely between therapists, but a typical program might involve training in self-control, social competence and empathy, and use cognitive restructuring to change views on sex with children. The most common form of this therapy is relapse prevention, where the patient is taught to identify and respond to potentially risky situations based on principles used for treating addictions.

The evidence for cognitive behavioral therapy is mixed. A 2012 Cochrane Review of randomized trials found that CBT had no effect on risk of reoffending for contact sex offenders. Meta-analyses in 2002 and 2005, which included both randomized and non-randomized studies, concluded that CBT reduced recidivism. There is debate over whether non-randomized studies should be considered informative. More research is needed.

==== Behavioral interventions ====
Behavioral treatments target sexual arousal to children, using satiation and aversion techniques to suppress sexual arousal to children and covert sensitization (or masturbatory reconditioning) to increase sexual arousal to adults. Behavioral treatments appear to have an effect on sexual arousal patterns during phallometric testing, but it is not known whether the effect represents changes in sexual interests or changes in the ability to control genital arousal during testing, nor whether the effect persists in the long term. For sex offenders with mental disabilities, applied behavior analysis has been used.

==== Sex drive reduction ====
Pharmacological interventions are used to lower the sex drive in general, which can ease the management of pedophilic feelings, but does not change sexual preference. Antiandrogens work by interfering with the activity of testosterone. Cyproterone acetate (Androcur) and medroxyprogesterone acetate (Depo-Provera) are the most commonly used. The efficacy of antiandrogens has some support, but few high-quality studies exist. Cyproterone acetate has the strongest evidence for reducing sexual arousal, while findings on medroxyprogesterone acetate have been mixed.

Gonadotropin-releasing hormone analogs such as leuprorelin (Lupron), which last longer and have fewer side-effects, are also used to reduce libido, as are selective serotonin reuptake inhibitors. The evidence for these alternatives is more limited and mostly based on open trials and case studies. All of these treatments, commonly referred to as "chemical castration", are often used in conjunction with cognitive behavioral therapy. According to the Association for the Treatment of Sexual Abusers, when treating child molesters, "anti-androgen treatment should be coupled with appropriate monitoring and counseling within a comprehensive treatment plan." These drugs may have side-effects, such as weight gain, gynecomastia, liver damage and osteoporosis.

Historically, surgical castration was used to lower sex drive by reducing testosterone. The emergence of pharmacological methods of adjusting testosterone has made it largely obsolete, because they are similarly effective and less invasive. It is still occasionally performed in Germany, the Czech Republic, Switzerland, and a few U.S. states. Non-randomized studies have reported that surgical castration reduces recidivism in contact sex offenders. The Association for the Treatment of Sexual Abusers opposes surgical castration and the Council of Europe works to bring the practice to an end in Eastern European countries where it is still applied through the courts.

=== Pedophilia ===
Pedophilia is a condition in which an adult or older adolescent is primarily or exclusively attracted to prepubescent children, whether the attraction is acted upon or not. A person with this paraphilia is called a pedophile.

In law enforcement, the term pedophile is sometimes used to describe those accused or convicted of child sexual abuse under sociolegal definitions of child (including both prepubescent children and adolescents younger than the local age of consent); however, not all child sexual offenders are pedophiles and not all pedophiles engage in sexual abuse of children. For these reasons, researchers recommend against imprecisely describing all child molesters as pedophiles.

The term pedocriminality (De: Pädokriminalität; Fr: pédocriminalité) is a controversial term which originated in the 1980s and has been used by organisations such as UNICEF, UNHRC, the World Health Organization and the Council of Europe to refer to child sexual abuse and sexual violence used against children, child prostitution, child trafficking and the use of child pornography. The term "cyber-pedocriminality" has been used to refer to the activities of viewers of child pornography online.

=== Recidivism ===
Although reconviction data suggests that most sex offenders do not reoffend, OJP reported that observed recidivism rates of sex offenders are underestimated of actual reoffending. Estimated rates among child sex offenders vary by surveys and it is difficult to estimate accurately. One study found that 42% of offenders re-offended (either a sex crime, violent crime, or both) after they were released. Risk for re-offense was highest in the first 6 years after release, but continued to be significant even 10–31 years later, with 23% offending during this time. A study done in California in 1965 found an 18.2% recidivism rate for offenders targeting the opposite sex and a 34.5% recidivism rate for same-sex offenders after 5 years.

Because recidivism is defined and measured differently from study to study, one can arrive at inaccurate conclusions being made based on comparison of two or more studies that are not conducted with similar methodology.

=== Other children ===
When a prepubescent child is sexually abused by one or more other children or adolescent youths, and no adult is directly involved, it is defined as child-on-child sexual abuse. The definition includes any sexual activity between children that occurs without consent, without equality, or due to coercion, whether the offender uses physical force, threats, trickery or emotional manipulation to compel cooperation. When sexual abuse is perpetrated by one sibling upon another, it is known as "intersibling abuse", a form of incest.

Unlike research on adult offenders, a strong causal relationship has been established between child and adolescent offenders and these offenders' own prior victimization, by either adults or other children.

=== Teachers ===
According to a 2010 UNICEF report, 46% of Congolese schoolgirls confirmed that they had been victims of sexual harassment, abuse, and violence committed by their teachers or other school personnel. In Mozambique, a study by the Ministry of Education found that 70 percent of female respondents reported knowing teachers who use sexual intercourse as a necessary condition to advance students to the next grade. A survey by Promundo found that 16% of girls in North Kivu said they had been forced to have sex with their teachers. According to UNICEF, teachers in Mali are known to use "La menace du bic rouge" ("the threat of the red pen"), using the threat of bad grades to coerce girls into acquiescing to sexual advances. According to Plan International, 16% of children in Togo, for instance, named a teacher as responsible for the pregnancy of a classmate.

== Prevalence ==
=== Global ===
Based on self-disclosure data, a 2011 meta-analysis of 217 studies between 1980 and 2008 estimated a global prevalence of 12.7%–18% for girls and 7.6% for boys. The rates of self-disclosed abuse for specific continents were as follows:

Region	Girls	Boys
Africa	20.2%	19.3%
Asia	11.3%	4.1%
Australia	21.5%	7.5%
Europe	13.5%	5.6%
South America	13.4%	13.8%
US/Canada	20.1%	8%

A 2009 meta-analysis of 65 studies from 22 countries found a global prevalence of 19.7% for females and 7.9% for males for some form of child sexual abuse prior to the age of 18. In that analysis, Africa had the highest prevalence rate of child sexual abuse (34.4%), primarily because of high rates in South Africa; Europe showed the lowest prevalence rate (9.2%); and America and Asia had prevalence rates between 10.1% and 23.9%.

Some scientists argue that prevalence rates are much higher, and that many cases of child abuse are never reported. One study found that professionals failed to report approximately 40% of the child sexual abuse cases they encountered.

=== Africa ===
A ten-country school-based study in southern Africa in 2007 found 19.6% of female students and 21.1% of male students aged 11–16 years reported they had experienced forced or coerced sex. Rates among 16-year-olds were 28.8% in females and 25.4% in males. Comparing the same schools in eight countries between 2003 and 2007, age-standardised on the 2007 Botswana male sample, there was no significant decrease between 2003 and 2007 among females in any country and inconsistent changes among males.

The prevalence of child sexual abuse in Africa is compounded by the virgin cleansing myth that sexual intercourse with a virgin will cure a man of HIV or AIDS. The myth is prevalent in South Africa, Zimbabwe, Zambia and Nigeria and is being blamed for the high rate of sexual abuse against young children.

In November 2007, Thomson Reuters Foundation reported that child rape is on the rise in the war-ravaged eastern Democratic Republic of the Congo. Aid workers blame combatants on all sides, who operate with much impunity, for a culture of sexual violence. South Africa has some of the highest incidences of child rape (including the rape of babies) in the world (also see sexual violence in South Africa). A survey by CIET found around 11% of boys and 4% of girls admitted to forcing someone else to have sex with them. In a related survey conducted among 1,500 schoolchildren, a quarter of all the boys interviewed said that "jackrolling", a term for gang rape, was fun. More than 67,000 cases of rape and sexual assaults against children were reported in 2000 in South Africa, compared to 37,500 in 1998. Child welfare groups believe that the number of unreported incidents could be up to 10 times that number. The largest increase in attacks was against children under seven. The virgin cleansing myth is especially common in South Africa, which has the highest number of HIV-positive citizens in the world. Eastern Cape social worker Edith Kriel notes that "child abusers are often relatives of their victims – even their fathers and providers."

A number of high-profile baby rapes appeared since 2001 (including the fact that they required extensive reconstructive surgery to rebuild urinary, genital, abdominal, or tracheal systems). In 2001, a 9-month-old was raped and likely lost consciousness as the pain was too much to bear. In February 2002, an 8-month-old infant was reportedly gang-raped by four men. One has been charged. The infant has required extensive reconstructive surgery. The 8-month-old infant's injuries were so extensive, increased attention on prosecution has occurred.

=== Asia ===
In Afghanistan, some boys are forced to participate in sexual activities with men. They are also termed 'dancing boys'. The custom is connected to sexual slavery and child prostitution.

In Bangladesh, child prostitutes are known to take the drug Oradexon, an over-the-counter steroid, usually used by farmers to fatten cattle, to make child prostitutes look larger and older. Charities say that 90% of prostitutes in the country's legalized brothels use the drug. According to social activists, the steroid can cause diabetes and high blood pressure and is highly addictive.

In 2007, the Indian Ministry of Women and Child Development published the "Study on Child Abuse: India 2007". It sampled 12447 children, 2324 young adults and 2449 stakeholders across 13 states. It looked at different forms of child abuse: physical abuse, sexual abuse and emotional abuse and girl child neglect in five evidence groups, namely, children in a family environment, children in school, children at work, children on the street and children in institutions. The study's main findings included: 53.22% of children reported having faced sexual abuse. Among them, 52.94% were boys and 47.06% girls. Andhra Pradesh, Assam, Bihar and Delhi reported the highest percentage of sexual abuse among both boys and girls, as well as the highest incidence of sexual assaults. 21.90% of child respondents faced severe forms of sexual abuse, 5.69% had been sexually assaulted and 50.76% reported other forms of sexual abuse. Children on the street, at work and in institutional care reported the highest incidence of sexual assault. The study also reported that 50% of abusers are known to the child or are in a position of trust and responsibility and most children had not reported the matter to anyone. Despite years of lack of any specific child sexual abuse laws in India, which treated them separately from adults in case of sexual offense, the Protection of Children Against Sexual Offences Bill, 2011 was passed the Indian parliament on May 22, 2012, which came into force from 14 November 2012.

According to research published in 2019 India had the largest number of child sexual abuse imagery searches along with being responsible for producing a third of the worlds child sexual abuse content online.

In Pakistan, sexual abuse of children is a problem in some madrassas. Child sexual abuse has also been reported in Madrassas across Bangladesh and India.

The Kasur child sexual abuse scandal, which involved forced sex acts and an estimated 280 to 300 children, was termed the largest child abuse scandal in Pakistan's history.

In 2019, Pakistan's Human Rights Minister, Shirin Mazari has said that Pakistan was ranked as the country with the largest numbers of child pornography viewers. Geo Pakistan, the Federal Investigation Agency, cyber-crime chief has said, "Child pornography is a business . . with those involved in the crime linked to international child pornography rings."

In Taiwan, a survey of adolescents reported 2.5% as having experienced childhood sexual abuse.

In China, although the prevalence of CSA is not low, ranging from 9% to 18%, most cases are not disclosed or reported in official national statistics. According to reports published by the NGO Protection of Girls, only 2,952 cases of CSA were publicly reported in the media from 2013 to 2021, involving approximately 5,500 child victims, while Peking University's "PKU Law" database recorded over 17,000 cases from 1991 to 2018.

In Uzbekistan, the UK Ambassador Craig Murray wrote that the government, under president Islam Karimov, used child rape to force false confessions from prisoners.

=== Pacific ===
According to UNICEF, nearly half of reported rape victims in Papua New Guinea are under 15 years of age and 13% are under 7 years of age while a report by ChildFund Australia citing former Parliamentarian Dame Carol Kidu stated 50% of those seeking medical help after rape are under 16, 25% are under 10 and 10% are under 8.

Additionally, a study found that men with a history of victimization, especially having been raped or otherwise sexually coerced themselves, were more likely than otherwise to have participated in both single-perpetrator and multiple-perpetrator non-partner rape. 57·5% (587/1022) of men who raped a non-partner committed their first rape as teenagers.

=== United States ===
Child sexual abuse occurs frequently in Western society, although the rate of prevalence can be difficult to determine.

The estimates for the United States vary widely.

Research in North America has concluded that approximately 15% to 25% of women and 5% to 15% of men were sexually abused when they were children. A literature review of 23 studies found rates of 3% to 37% for males and 8% to 71% for females, which produced an average of 17% for boys and 28% for girls, while a statistical analysis based on 16 cross-sectional studies estimated the rate to be 7.2% for males and 14.5% for females. The US Department of Health and Human Services reported 83,600 substantiated reports of sexually abused children in 2005, while state-level child protective services reported 63,527 sexual abuse incidents in 2010. According to Emily M. Douglas and David Finkelhor, "Several national studies have found that black and white children experienced near-equal levels of sexual abuse. Other studies, however, have found that both blacks and Latinos have an increased risk for sexual victimization". Reports by the Centers for Disease Control and Prevention reveal that about 1 in 4 girls and 1 in 20 boys in the United States experience child sexual abuse. Surveys have shown that one fifth to one third of all women reported some sort of childhood sexual experience with a male adult. A study by Lawson & Chaffin indicated that many children who were sexually abused were "identified solely by a physical complaint that was later diagnosed as a venereal disease ... Only 43% of the children who were diagnosed with venereal disease made a verbal disclosure of sexual abuse during the initial interview." It has been found in the epidemiological literature on CSA that there is no identifiable demographic or family characteristic of a child that can be used to bar the prospect that a child has been sexually abused.

Child marriage is often considered to be another form of child sexual abuse. Over 200,000 marriages involving minors were allowed between 2000 and 2015 in the US. These marriages were most often between an adult male and female minor. Child marriage in the United States is allowed in the majority of states as long as parental consent or judicial approval (typically for pregnancy) is given.

In US schools, according to the United States Department of Education, "nearly 9.6% of students are targets of educator sexual misconduct sometime during their school career." In studies of student sex abuse by male and female educators, male students were reported as targets in ranges from 23% to 44%. In U.S. school settings same-sex (female and male) sexual misconduct against students by educators "ranges from 18 to 28% of reported cases, depending on the study" An American survey found that children sexually abused by relatives were much more likely to be affiliated with Protestantism, while persons sexually abused by nonrelatives were affiliated with liberal denominations or irreligious.

Significant underreporting of sexual abuse of boys by both women and men is believed to occur due to sex stereotyping, social denial, the minimization of male victimization, and the relative lack of research on sexual abuse of boys. Sexual victimization of boys by their mothers or other female relatives is particularly rarely researched or reported. Sexual abuse of girls by their mothers, and other related and/or unrelated adult females is beginning to be researched and reported despite the highly taboo nature of female–female child sex abuse. In studies where students are asked about sex offenses, they report higher levels of female sex offenders than found in adult reports. This underreporting has been attributed to cultural denial of female-perpetrated child sex abuse, because "males have been socialized to believe they should be flattered or appreciative of sexual interest from a female." Journalist Cathy Young writes that under-reporting is contributed to by the difficulty of people, including jurors, in seeing a male as a "true victim".

=== Europe ===
In the United Kingdom, reported child sex abuse has increased, but this may be due to greater willingness to report. Police need more resources to deal with it. Also parents and schools need to give children and adolescents regular advice about how to spot abuse and about the need to report abuse. Software providers are urged to do more to police their environment and make it safe for children. In the UK, a 2010 study estimated prevalence at about 5% for boys and 18% for girls (not dissimilar to a 1985 study that estimated about 8% for boys and 12% for girls). 115,489 incidents were reported in England and Wales in 2023. Girls were six times more likely to be assaulted than boys with 86% of attacks taking place against them. Barnardo's charity estimates that two thirds of victims in the United Kingdom are girls and one third are boys. Barnardo's is concerned that boy victims may be overlooked.

A 1992 survey studying father-daughter incest in Finland reported that of the 9,000 15-year-old high school girls who filled out the questionnaires, of the girls living with their biological fathers, 0.2% reported father-daughter incest experiences; of the girls living with a stepfather, 3.7% reported sexual experiences with him. The reported counts included only father-daughter incest and did not include prevalence of other forms of child sexual abuse. The survey summary stated, "the feelings of the girls about their incestual experiences are overwhelmingly negative."

=== In pre-industrial societies ===
Cross-cultural studies have reported that sexual relations between men and pubescent girls were sometimes performed for functional reasons in pre-industrial societies. Other accounts of sexual relations between adults and minors have also been registered. A 1951 research document reports Siwan men engaging with anal intercourse with boys. The report also stated that, among Aranda aborigines, "pederasty [between a man and a boy between the ages of ten and twelve] is a recognized custom". An 18th-century report by James Cook reported an act of copulation between a man and a female estimated to be 11 or 12 years old in a public street "without the least sense of it being indecent or improper". In some Oceanic societies, adult men have been reported to have sexual contact with prepubertal females. A 19th-century document by missionary John Muggeridge Orsmond reads that "in all Tahitians as well as officers who come in ships there is a cry for little girls". Other instances of adult-child sexual behaviors have been reported in the Marquesas Islands, Polynesia, New Guinea and in Kaluli societies.

Accounts of sexual intercourse between children and adults have also been reported in Ancient Greece and Rome.

== International law ==
Child sexual abuse is outlawed nearly everywhere in the world, generally with severe criminal penalties such as life imprisonment or capital punishment. An adult's sexual intercourse with someone below the legal age of consent is defined as statutory rape, based on the principle that a child is not capable of consent and any apparent consent by a child is not considered legal consent.

The United Nations Convention on the Rights of the Child (CRC) is an international treaty that legally obliges states to protect children's rights. Articles 34 and 35 of the CRC require states to protect children from all forms of sexual exploitation and sexual abuse. This includes outlawing the coercion of a child to perform sexual activity, the prostitution of children, and the exploitation of children in creating pornography. States are also required to prevent the abduction, sale, or trafficking of children. As of November 2008, 193 countries are bound by the CRC, including every member of the United Nations except the United States and South Sudan.

The Council of Europe has adopted the Council of Europe Convention on the Protection of Children against Sexual Exploitation and Sexual Abuse in order to prohibit child sexual abuse that occurs within home or family.

In the European Union, child sexual abuse is subject to a directive. This directive deals with several forms of sexual abuse of children, especially commercial sexual exploitation of children.

== Challenges in enforcement ==
Although efforts for the enforcement of child protection laws have increased internationally, in countries with inadequate legal systems or where corruption runs rampant, the implementation of these laws has been difficult. There are several cases where law enforcement agencies lack the manpower and resources to efficiently resolve CSA crimes, which leads to reduced rates of prosecution and conviction. Furthermore, with the addition of ever-changing technology and new information, the tension placed on law enforcement agencies to effectively pursue, and arrest offenders has increased. To effectively address these challenges, cooperation among government agencies, international organizations, and law enforcement must increase, along with the development of a new legal agenda to improve the training of law enforcement on how to properly handle CSA. The 2014 Independent Inquiry into Child Sexual Exploitation in Rotherham described "nervousness about identifying the ethnic origins of perpetrators for fear of being thought racist" and "direction from their managers not to do so" as obstacles.

== Research ==
Child sexual abuse has gained public attention since the 1970s and has become one of the most high-profile crimes. While sexual use of children by adults has been present throughout history, public interest in prevention has tended to fluctuate. Initially, concern centered around children under the age of ten, but over time, advocates have attracted attention toward the sexual abuse of children between the ages of 11 and 17. Up until the 1930s, the psychological impact of sexual abuse was not emphasized, instead emphasis was placed on the physical harm or the child's reputation. Widespread public awareness of children's sexual abuse did not occur until the 1970s in the West.

=== Early writings ===
The first published work dedicated specifically to child sexual abuse appeared in France in 1857: Medical-Legal Studies of Sexual Assault (Etude Médico-Légale sur les Attentats aux Mœurs), by Auguste Ambroise Tardieu, the noted French pathologist and pioneer of forensic medicine.

== In society ==
Child sexual abuse became a public issue in the 1970s and 1980s. Prior to this point in time, sexual abuse remained rather secretive and socially unspeakable. Studies on child molestation were nonexistent until the 1920s, and the first national estimate of the number of child sexual abuse cases was published in 1948. By 1968, 44 out of 50 U.S. states had enacted mandatory laws that required physicians to report cases of suspicious child abuse. Legal action became more prevalent in the 1970s with the enactment of the Child Abuse Prevention and Treatment Act in 1974, coupled with the creation of the National Center for Child Abuse and Neglect. Since the creation of the Child Abuse and Treatment Act, reported child abuse cases have increased dramatically. Finally, the National Abuse Coalition was created in 1979 to create pressure in congress to create more sexual abuse laws.

Second wave feminism brought greater awareness of child sexual abuse and violence against women, making them public, political issues. Judith Lewis Herman, Harvard professor of psychiatry, wrote the first book ever on father-daughter incest when she discovered during her medical residency that a large number of the women she was seeing had been victims of father-daughter incest. Herman notes that her approach to her clinical experience grew out of her involvement in the civil rights movement. Her second book, Trauma and Recovery, coined the term complex post-traumatic stress disorder and included child sexual abuse as a cause.

In 1986, Congress passed the Child Abuse Victims' Rights Act, giving children a civil claim in sexual abuse cases. The number of laws created in the 1980s and 1990s began to create greater prosecution and detection of child sexual abusers. During the 1970s, a large transition began in the legislature related to child sexual abuse. Megan's Law, which was enacted in 1996 gives the public access to knowledge of sex offenders nationwide.

Anne Hastings described these changes in attitudes towards child sexual abuse as "the beginning of one of history's largest social revolutions."

According to John Jay College of Criminal Justice professor B.J. Cling:

By the early 21st century, the issue of child sexual abuse has become a legitimate focus of professional attention, while increasingly separated from second wave feminism ... As child sexual abuse becomes absorbed into the larger field of interpersonal trauma studies, child sexual abuse studies and intervention strategies have become degendered and largely unaware of their political origins in modern feminism and other vibrant political movements of the 1970s. One may hope that unlike in the past, this rediscovery of child sexual abuse that began in the 70s will not again be followed by collective amnesia. The institutionalization of child maltreatment interventions in federally funded centers, national and international societies, and a host of research studies (in which the United States continues to lead the world) offers grounds for cautious optimism. Nevertheless, as Judith Herman argues cogently, 'The systematic study of psychological trauma ... depends on the support of a political movement.'

=== Media reporting and its quality ===
Media reporting about child sexual abuse has brought the topic into the public and political agenda. Media reporting has also exposed sexual abuse cases in institutions, leading to their investigation. One notorious example is the Boston Globe coverage of the sex abuse scandal in the Catholic Archdiocese of Boston for which the newspaper received a Pulitzer Prize for Public Service in 2003. Another award-winning example is the Indianapolis Star coverage of the USA Gymnastics sex abuse scandal in 2016.

However, media reporting can also violate the rights of abuse survivors and disseminate misleading and harmful messages. Content analyses of news reporting have found quality issues such as a focus on sensationalized individual cases (so-called episodic framing) and neglect of thematic framing in the sense of contextualizing individual cases and pointing to the systematic problems that enable child sexual abuse. When media reporting on child sexual abuse is investigated, usual methodological approaches are the media content analysis and the media quality analysis. Here it is important to not only analyze text but also documentary and stock photos commonly used in media that report about child sexual abuse. Research shows that myths and stereotypes about child sexual abuse are disseminated through text and images alike. Several checklists and guidelines for journalist have been published by violence prevention and journalism organizations to help improve the quality of news reporting on child sexual abuse.

=== Civil lawsuits ===
In the United States, growing awareness of child sexual abuse has sparked an increasing number of civil lawsuits for monetary damages stemming from such incidents. Increased awareness of child sexual abuse has encouraged more victims to come forward, whereas in the past victims often kept their abuse secret. Some states have enacted specific laws lengthening the applicable statutes of limitations so as to allow victims of child sexual abuse to file suit sometimes years after they have reached the age of majority. Such lawsuits can be brought where a person or entity, such as a school, church, youth organization, or daycare, was charged with supervising the child but failed to do so with child sexual abuse resulting, making the individual or institution liable. In the Catholic sex abuse cases, the various Roman Catholic Diocese in the United States have paid out approximately $1 billion settling hundreds of such lawsuits since the early 1990s. There have also been lawsuits involving the American religious right. As lawsuits can involve demanding procedures, there is a concern that children or adults who file suit will be re-victimized by defendants through the legal process, much as rape victims can be re-victimized by the accused in criminal rape trials. The child sexual abuse plaintiff's attorney Thomas A. Cifarelli has written that children involved in the legal system, particularly victims of sexual abuse and molestation, should be afforded certain procedural safeguards to protect them from harassment during the legal process.

In June 2008 in Zambia, the issue of teacher-student sexual abuse and sexual assault was brought to the attention of the High Court of Zambia where a landmark case decision, with presiding Judge Philip Musonda, awarded $45 million Zambian kwacha (US$13,000) to the plaintiff, a 13-year-old girl for sexual abuse and rape by her school teacher. This claim was brought against her teacher as a "person of authority" who, as Judge Musonda stated, "had a moral superiority (responsibility) over his students" at the time.

A 2000 World Health Organization–Geneva report, "World Report on Violence and Health (Chap 6 – Sexual Violence)" states, "Action in schools is vital for reducing sexual and other forms of violence. In many countries a sexual relation between a teacher and a pupil is not a serious disciplinary offence and policies on sexual harassment in schools either do not exist or are not implemented. In recent years, though, some countries have introduced laws prohibiting sexual relations between teachers and pupils. Such measures are important in helping eradicate sexual harassment in schools. At the same time, a wider range of actions is also needed, including changes to teacher training and recruitment and reforms of curricula, so as to transform gender relations in schools."

== See also ==
- 17th-century sexual molestation at Naples school
- Abusive power and control – Aspect of personal relationships
- Bacha Bazi – Form of child sexual abuse in Central Asia
- Betrayal Trauma – Trauma perpetrated by someone close to the victim
- Cases of children imprisoned by relatives
- Catholic Church sex abuse cases
- Child erotica – Non-pornographic material of children used for sexual purposes
- Child Exploitation Tracking System – Microsoft-made software (CETS)
- Child marriage – Marriage with someone under the legal age
- Child-on-child sexual abuse – Sexual abuse between children
- Child pornography – Erotic materials depicting minors
- Child sex tourism – Tourism for engaging child prostitution
- Child sexual abuse in Nigeria
- Child welfare – Protecting children from harm and neglect
- Children's Bureau
- Commercial sexual exploitation of children – Form of child sexual abuse
- Complex post-traumatic stress disorder – Mental disorder associated with trauma
- Estimates of sexual violence – Prevalence of violent sexual crime
- False allegation of child sexual abuse – Accusation of child molestation when it has not actually occurred
- Institutional abuse – Mistreatment of a person from a system of power
- Isolation to facilitate abuse – Lack of contact between an individual and society
- International Centre for Missing & Exploited Children – Nonprofit global organization (ICMEC) combats child sexual exploitation, child pornography, and child abduction.
- Jimmy Savile sexual abuse scandal – Abuse scandal in the United Kingdom
- Joël Le Scouarnec's case – French surgeon and child rapist (born 1950)
- National Society for the Prevention of Cruelty to Children – British child protection charity – a UK organisation set up to combat child abuse, gained controversy in the 1980s–1990s over its dealings with Satanic ritual abuse amongst children.
- Online predator – Person who commits sexual abuse via the Internet
- Penn State child sex abuse scandal
- PTSD in children and adolescents
- Prostitution of children – Form of child sexual exploitation
- Protect – Organization for the protection of children
- Rochdale child sex abuse ring – 21st-century criminal gang in Greater Manchester, England
- Sexual harassment and abuse of students by teachers – Specific kind of sexual harassment
- Statutory rape – Sexual activity with a person under the age of consent

== Sources ==
- Kuehnle, Kathryn (1996). Assessing allegations of child sexual abuse. Professional Resource Press. ISBN 978-1-56887-009-0. OCLC 1391162783. OL 795662M. NCJ 161803.
