= Clegg-Hill =

Clegg-Hill is a surname and could refer to:

- Rowland Clegg-Hill, 3rd Viscount Hill (1833–1895) slide to bankruptcy of Hawkstone Park
- Rowland Richard Clegg-Hill, 4th Viscount Hill (1863–1923) forced to sell contents and break up estate at Hawkstone Park
- Francis William Clegg-Hill, 5th Viscount Hill (1866–1924)
- Charles Rowland Clegg-Hill, 6th Viscount Hill (1876–1957)
- Gerald Rowland Clegg-Hill, 7th Viscount Hill (1904–1974)
- Antony Rowland Clegg-Hill, 8th Viscount Hill (1931–2003)

== See also ==
- Clegg (name)
- Hill (surname)
