= Termite-flg RNA motif =

Conserved RNA structure identified by bioinformatics

Termite-flg RNA
- Consensus secondary structure of Termite-flg RNAs

Identifiers
- Symbol: Termite-flg
- Alt. Symbols: tg-flg
- Rfam: RF01729

Other data
- RNA type: Cis-regulatory element
- Domain(s): Termite gut metagenome
- PDB structures: PDBe

The Termite-flg RNA motif (also called tg-flg) is a conserved RNA structure identified by bioinformatics. Genomic sequences corresponding to Termite-flg RNAs have been identified only in uncultivated bacteria present in the termite hindgut. As of 2010 it has not been identified in the DNA of any cultivated species, and is thus an example of RNAs present in environmental samples.

Termite-flg RNAs are consistently located in what is presumed to be the 5' untranslated regions of genes that encode proteins whose functions relate to flagella. The RNAs are hypothesized to regulate these genes in an unknown mechanism.
