= James S. Clegg =

American biochemist (1933–2024)

James Clegg
- Born: James Standish Clegg; July 27, 1933; Aspinwall, Pennsylvania, U.S.
- Died: September 11, 2024 (aged 91); Bodega Bay, California, U.S.
- Education: Pennsylvania State University (BS); Johns Hopkins University (PhD)
- Awards: Phi Beta Kappa (1958); Fellow of the AAAS (1985)
- Scientific career
- Fields: Biochemistry; Cryptobiosis
- Workplaces: University of California, Davis; University of Miami
- Thesis: The physiology of blood trehalose and its function during flight in the blowfly (1961)
- Website: biology.ucdavis.edu/people/james-clegg

James Standish Clegg (July 27, 1933 – September 11, 2024) was an American biochemist who was Professor Emeritus of Biochemistry at University of California, Davis, based at the Coastal and Marine Sciences Institute (CMSI) in Bodega Bay, California. He served as director of the Bodega Marine Laboratory (BML) from 1986 to 1999 and as president of the National Association Marine Laboratories (NAML) from 1991 to 1993.

== Early life and education ==
Clegg was born in Aspinwall, Pennsylvania on July 27, 1933. He received his Bachelor of Science degree from Pennsylvania State University in Zoology in 1958 and his PhD from Johns Hopkins University in 1961 for research investigating the physiology of blood trehalose and its function during flight in the blowfly.

== Research and career ==
After his PhD, Clegg was a postdoctoral researcher with David R. Evans from 1961 to 1962. At the National Institutes of Health (NIH) Clegg was a predoctoral fellow and postdoctoral fellow from 1960 to 1962. He was a professor at University of Miami from 1963 to 1986 and UC Davis from 1986. He has been a visiting scientist at Oak Ridge National Laboratory (ORNL) in 1966, the Centre national de la recherche scientifique (CNRS, Paris), and University College of Wales in Aberystwyth, United Kingdom in 1990 and Ghent University in 1999.

Clegg's research interests were biochemical and biophysical adaptations to environmental extremes (extremophiles); stress proteins and molecular chaperones in invertebrates; organization of enzymes and metabolic activity in the aqueous compartments of cells and the physical properties of intracellular water. His research used brine shrimp and Artemia salina as model organism.

== Death ==
Clegg died at home in Bodega Bay, California on September 11, 2024, at the age of 91.

== Awards and honors ==
Clegg was awarded Phi Beta Kappa (ΦΒΚ) from Pennsylvania State University in 1958. Clegg was a Woodrow Wilson fellow at the Johns Hopkins University from 1958 to 1959. He was a Fulbright Program senior research fellow at the University of London in 1978 and again at Ghent University, Belgium in 1999. He was elected Fellow of the American Association for the Advancement of Science (FAAAS) in 1985.
