= IMES-1 RNA motif =

Consensus secondary structure of IMES-1 RNAs. This figure is adapted from supplementary data of a previous publication. The indicated "transcription terminator" is predicted as a Rho-independent transcription terminator.

The IMES-1 RNA motif is a conserved RNA structure that was identified in marine environmental sequences by two studies based on metagenomics and bioinformatics, the first analyzing metatranscriptome (RNA) data and the second using metagenome (DNA) data. These RNAs are present in environmental sequences, and as of 2009 are not known to be present in any cultivated species. However, the species that use these RNAs are most closely related to known alphaproteobacteria and gammaproteobacteria. IMES-1 RNAs make up a significant portion of marine RNA transcripts and are exceptionally abundant in that over five times as many IMES-1 RNAs were found as ribosomes in RNAs sampled from the Pacific Ocean. Only two bacterial RNAs are known (6S RNA and transfer RNA) to be more highly transcribed than ribosomes. IMES-1 RNAs were also detected in abundance in Block Island Sound in the Atlantic Ocean.
