= IMES-2 RNA motif =

Consensus secondary structure of IMES-2 RNAs. This figure is adapted from supplementary data of a previous publication.

Predicted IMES-2 RNA secondary structure in alphaproteobacterium HIMB114. Nucleotides are numbered starting at the 5′ end. Lines labeled "0 nt" do not contain any nucleotides.

The IMES-2 RNA motif is a conserved RNA structure that was identified by a study based on metagenomics and bioinformatics, and the underlying RNA sequences were identified independently by a similar earlier study. These RNAs are present in environmental sequences, and when discovered were not known to be present in any cultivated species. However, an IMES-2 RNA has been detected in alphaproteobacterium HIMB114, which is classified in the SAR11 clade of marine bacteria. This finding fits with earlier predictions that species that use IMES-2 RNAs are most closely related to alphaproteobacteria. IMES-2 RNAs are exceptionally abundant, as twice as many IMES-2 RNAs were found as ribosomes in RNAs sampled from the Pacific Ocean. Only two bacterial RNAs are known (6S RNA and transfer RNA) to be more highly transcribed than ribosomes.

The IMES-2 RNA secondary structure contains four stem-loop structures and one pseudoknot.
