= Clegg =

Clegg may refer to:

- Clegg (name), given name and surname (including a list of people with the name)
- Cleg or horse-fly, large, agile fly with bloodsucking females
- Clegg, North Carolina, unincorporated community in the United States
- Clegg (film), 1970 British crime film
