= IMES-4 RNA motif =

Consensus secondary structure of IMES-4 RNAs. This figure is adapted from supplementary data of a previous publication.

The IMES-4 RNA motif is a conserved RNA structure that was identified in marine environmental sequences by metagenomics and bioinformatics. These RNAs are present in environmental sequences, and as of 2009 are not known to be present in any cultivated species. IMES-4 RNAs are fairly abundant in comparison to ribosomes in RNAs sampled from the Pacific Ocean.
