= Lacto-usp RNA motif =

Lacto-usp RNA
- Consensus secondary structure of Lacto-usp RNAs

Identifiers
- Symbol: Lacto-usp RNA
- Rfam: RF01710

Other data
- RNA type: sRNA
- Domain: Lactic acid bacteria
- PDB structures: PDBe

The Lacto-usp RNA motif is a conserved RNA structure identified in bacteria by bioinformatics. Lacto-usp RNAs are found exclusively in lactic acid bacteria, and exclusively in the possible 5′ untranslated regions of (5′ UTRs) operons that contain a hypothetical gene and a usp gene. The usp gene encodes the universal stress protein. It was proposed that the Lacto-usp might correspond to the 6S RNA of the relevant species, because four of five of these species lack a predicted 6S RNA, and 6S RNAs commonly occur in 5′ UTRs of usp genes. However, given that the Lacto-usp RNA motif is much shorter than the standard 6S RNA structure, the function of Lacto-usp RNAs remains unclear.
