= WcaG RNA motif =

wcaG RNA motif
- Consensus secondary structure of wcaG RNAs

Identifiers
- Symbol: wcaG RNA
- Rfam: RF01761

Other data
- RNA type: Cis-regulatory element
- Domain(s): Cyanobacteria
- PDB structures: PDBe

The wcaG RNA motif is an RNA structure conserved in some bacteria that was detected by bioinformatics. wcaG RNAs are found in certain phages that infect cyanobacteria. Most known wcaG RNAs were found in sequences of DNA extracted from uncultivated marine bacteria. wcaG RNAs might function as cis-regulatory elements, in view of their consistent location in the possible 5' untranslated regions of genes. It was suggested the wcaG RNAs might further function as riboswitches.

The genes hypothesized to be regulated by wcaG RNAs function in the synthesis of exopolysaccharides, or are induced by high amounts of light. These latter genes are presumably related to cyanobacterial photosynthesis. The detected wcaG RNAs in purified phages are upstream of highlighted-induced genes. Although these genes are not thought of as typical of phages, it has previously been observed that phages infecting cyanobacteria commonly incorporate such genes.
