= Child Exploitation Tracking System =

Microsoft-made software

The Child Exploitation Tracking System (CETS) is a Microsoft software system that helps law enforcement manage and link worldwide cases related to child sexual abuse material. CETS was developed in collaboration with law enforcement and nonprofit partners in Canada. Administered by the loose partnership of Microsoft and law enforcement agencies, CETS offers tools to gather and share evidence and information so they can identify, prevent and prosecute those who commit crimes against children.

== Partnership with Toronto Police ==
In 2003, Detective Sergeant Paul Gillespie, Officer in Charge of the Child Exploitation Section of the Toronto Police Service's Sex Crimes Unit, made a request directly to Bill Gates, CEO and Chief Architect at Microsoft at the time, for assistance with these types of crimes. Agencies experienced in tracking and apprehending those who perpetrate such crimes were involved in the design, implementation, and policy. The solution needed to assist law enforcement agencies from the initial point of detection, through the investigative phase, to arrest, prosecution, and conviction of the criminal. In addition, it was imperative that the solution adhered to existing rights and civil liberties of the citizens of the various countries. This included remaining independent of Internet traffic and any individual user’s computer. Finally, such a solution needed to be global in nature and enable collaboration among nations and agencies.

In order to increase the effectiveness of investigators worldwide, such a system would allow law enforcement entities to:

- Collect evidence of online child exploitation gathered by multiple law enforcement agencies.
- Organize and store the information safely and securely.
- Search the database of information.
- Securely share the information with other agencies, across jurisdictions.
- Analyze the information and provide pertinent matches.
- Adhere to global software industry standards.

== Additional law enforcement partnerships ==
Law enforcement agencies that have used or are deploying the CETS tool:

- Australia: High Tech Crime Centre
- Brazil: Federal Police
- Canada: Royal Canadian Mounted Police, Toronto Police Services Sex Crime Unit, & Twenty-six other Canadian police services
- Chile: National Investigative Police
- Indonesia: National Police
- Italy: Ministry of Interior and Postal police
- Romania: National Police
- Spain: Interior Ministry
- United Kingdom: Child Exploitation and Online Protection Command of the National Crime Agency.
- United States: Department of Homeland Security and Federal Bureau of Investigation
- In Planning : Poland, Argentina and United Arab Emirates

== See also ==
- Canadian Centre for Child Protection
- National Center for Missing & Exploited Children (United States)
