= Richard Clegg =

British physicist

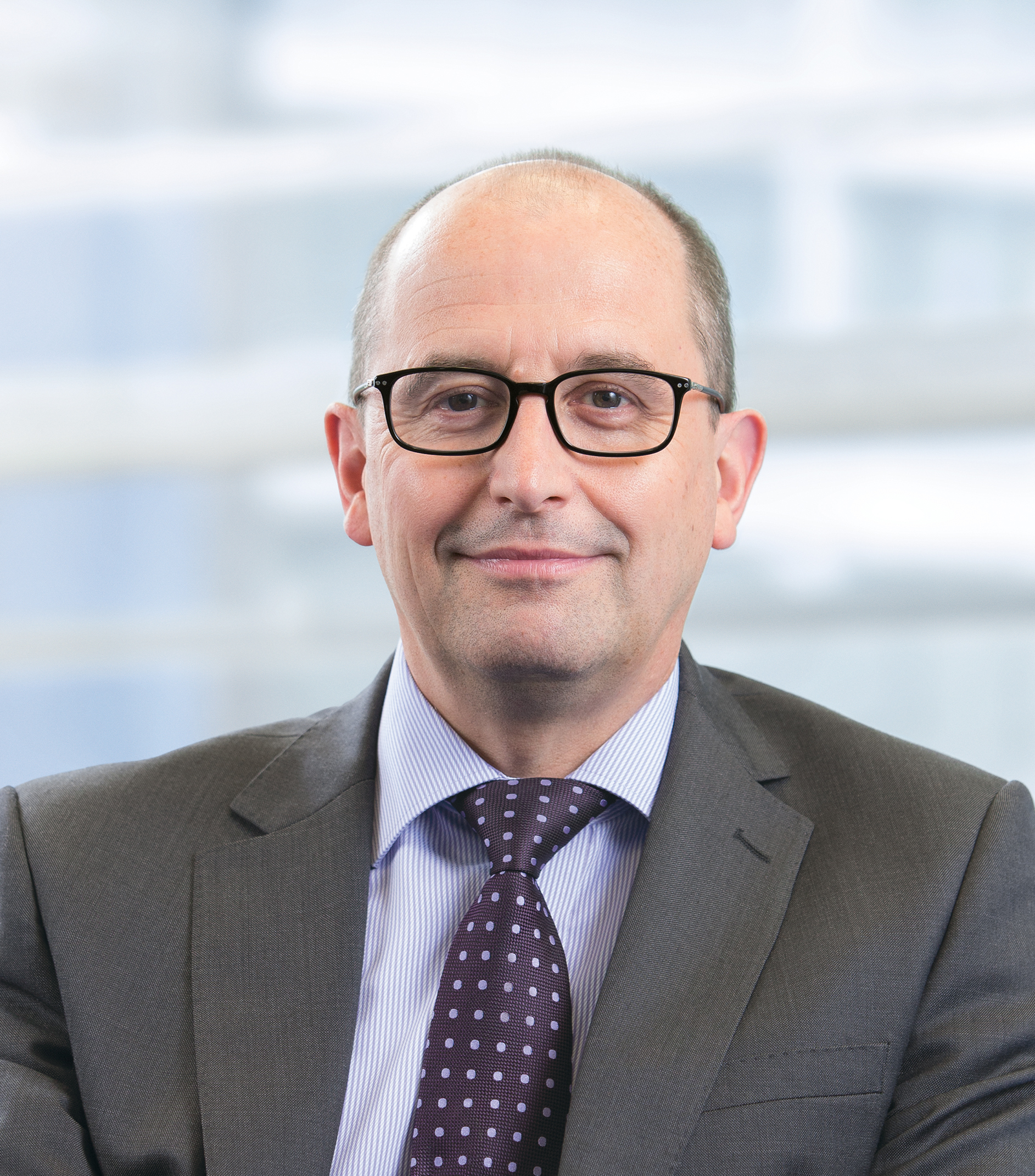
Richard Clegg

Richard Clegg is former chief executive director of the Lloyd’s Register Foundation, the shareholder of the Lloyd's Register Group. It is one of largest charitable foundations in UK in terms of revenue, focused on engineering science, research and education.

== Career ==
Clegg has 30 years nuclear background in industry, government and academia in the civil and defence sectors. He was director of science at British Nuclear Fuels between 1997 and 2005. In 2002 he became an honorary professor at the University of Manchester. In 2003 he became the project manager of Project Dalton, which led to the creation of the Dalton Nuclear Institute, the nuclear research institute of the University of Manchester, in 2005. On its creation Clegg became the director of the institute.

After 10 years as chief executive of the foundation since it was established, Clegg announced his plan to retire in 2022.
