= Thaddeus von Clegg =

German-American clockmaker

Thaddeus von Clegg was a German-American clockmaker who constructed the first kazoo in the 1840s in Georgia.

The kazoo, also called the Clegghorn, is based on the African mirliton, and was a popular African-American folk instrument during the 19th century. The manufactured version we know today was invented in Macon, Georgia, by von Clegg in collaboration in the 1840s. The first manufactured kazoo was made by von Clegg, and the instrument was introduced to the South at the Georgia State Fair in 1852.
