= Clegg, North Carolina =

- Unincorporated community
- Location of Clegg in North Carolina Clegg, North Carolina (the United States)
- Coordinates: 35°51′57″N 78°50′58″W
- Country: United States
- State: North Carolina
- County: Wake
- Elevation: 387 ft (118 m)
- Time zone: UTC-5 (Eastern (EST))
  - Summer (DST): UTC-4 (EDT)
- Area code(s): 919 & 984
- GNIS feature ID: 1019692

Clegg is an unincorporated community in Wake County, North Carolina, United States on North Carolina Highway 54, north of the highway's intersection with North Carolina Highway 540.
