= 16S rRNA (cytosine1402-N4)-methyltransferase =

Class of enzymes

16S rRNA (cytosine^{1402}-N^{4})-methyltransferase

Identifiers
- EC no.: 2.1.1.199

Databases
- IntEnz: IntEnz view
- BRENDA: BRENDA entry
- ExPASy: NiceZyme view
- KEGG: KEGG entry
- MetaCyc: metabolic pathway
- PRIAM: profile
- PDB structures: RCSB PDB PDBe PDBsum
Search
- PMC: articles
- PubMed: articles
- NCBI: proteins

16S rRNA (cytosine^{1402}-N^{4})-methyltransferase (EC 2.1.1.199, RsmH, MraW) is an enzyme with systematic name S-adenosyl-L-methionine:16S rRNA (cytosine1402-N4)-methyltransferase. This enzyme catalyses the following chemical reaction

S-adenosyl-L-methionine + cytosine^{1402} in 16S rRNA $\rightleftharpoons$ S-adenosyl-L-homocysteine + N^{4}-methylcytosine^{1402} in 16S rRNA

RsmH catalyses the N^{4}-methylation of cytosine^{1402}.
