= Postal police =

Postal police are generally law enforcement agencies with responsibility for policing the postal or telecommunications systems of various countries. This includes protecting against theft of the mail, as well as protecting the staff from violent crimes.

- United Kingdom
  - Royal Mail Group Security
- United States
  - United States Postal Inspection Service
- Germany
  - Postschutz
- Italy
  - Polizia postale e delle comunicazioni
