= Gut-1 RNA motif =

Gut-1 RNA
- Consensus secondary structure of Gut-1 RNAs

Identifiers
- Symbol: Gut-1
- Alt. Symbols: gt-1
- Rfam: RF01706

Other data
- RNA type: sRNA
- Domain: Metagenomic camples
- PDB structures: PDBe

The Gut-1 RNA motif (also called gt-1) is a conserved RNA structure identified by bioinformatics. These RNAs are present in environmental sequences, and as of 2010 are not known to be present in any species that has been grown under laboratory conditions. Gut-1 RNA is exclusively found in DNA from uncultivated bacteria present in samples from the human gut.
