= Captain Clegg =

Captain Clegg may refer to:

- Captain Clegg a character in the Doctor Syn stories
- Captain Clegg (film), a 1962 film by Hammer Films
- Captain Clegg & The Night Creatures, a psychobilly band featured in the 2009 film Halloween II
