= Lactis-plasmid RNA motif =

Conserved RNA structure

lactis-plasmid RNA
- Consensus secondary structure of lactis-plasmid RNAs

Identifiers
- Symbol: lactis-plasmid RNA
- Rfam: RF01742

Other data
- RNA type: sRNA
- Domain: lactic acid bacteria
- PDB structures: PDBe

The lactis-plasmid RNA motif is a conserved RNA structure identified by bioinformatics. The RNAs are restricted to lactic acid bacteria, and are especially common in Lactococcus lactis. They typically lie near to repB genes, and are almost found in plasmids. This data suggested that lactis-plasmid RNAs participate in the control of plasmid abundance. However, many of the plasmids that carry lactis-plasmid RNAs also carry ctRNA-pND324 RNAs, which are involved in plasmid copy count regulation. Therefore lactis-plasmid RNAs might have a different function.

== See also ==
- R1162-like plasmid antisense RNA
