= Henry Clegg =

English cricketer (1850–1920)

Henry Clegg (8 December 1850 – 30 December 1920) was an English first-class cricketer, who played six matches for Yorkshire County Cricket Club in 1881. He also appeared for T Emmett's XI in first-class matches in 1881 and 1883.

Born in Birstall, near Batley, Yorkshire, England, Clegg was a right hand batsman, who scored 96 runs at 10.66, with a top score of 27. He also played for Northumberland in the Minor Counties Cricket Championship in 1884. He played for the Dewsbury and Savile club in the 1890s, and spent a year at Little Lever C.C. in Bolton, as joint groundsman. He worked as a woollen cloth finisher, according to the census of 1881, and had a wife, Hannah and a son, James.

Clegg died aged 70, in December 1920, in Dewsbury, Yorkshire.
