= Whalefall-1 RNA motif =

- Consensus secondary structure of Whalefall-1 RNAs

Identifiers
- Symbol: wf-1
- Rfam: RF01762

Other data
- RNA type: sRNA
- Domain: Whale fall metagenome
- PDB structures: PDBe

The Whalefall-1 RNA motif (also called wf-1) refers to a conserved RNA structure that was discovered using bioinformatics. Structurally, the motif consists of two stem-loops (see diagram), the second of which is often terminated by a CUUG tetraloop, which is an energetically favorable RNA sequence. Whalefall-1 RNAs are found only in DNA extracted from uncultivated bacteria found on whale fall, i.e., a whale carcass. As of 2010, Whalefall-1 RNAs have not been detected in any known, cultivated species of bacteria, and are thus one of several RNAs present in environmental samples.
