= Melancthon =

Melanchthon, Melancthon or Melancton may refer to:

== Surname ==
- Philip Melanchthon (1497–1560), German Lutheran reformer, collaborator with Martin Luther
- G. D. Melanchthon (1934–1994), Indian theologian

== Given name ==
- Melancthon J. Briggs (1846–1923), American politician
- Melancthon Williams Jacobus Jr. (1855–1937), American theologian
- Melancton Smith (1744–1798), American delegate to the Continental Congress and merchant
- Melancton Smith (1810–1893), US Navy rear admiral
- Melancthon Smith (Confederate officer) (1829–1881), American Civil War Confederate colonel
- Melancthon S. Wade (1802–1868), American businessman, horticulturist and Civil War Union Army general
- Melancthon Brooks Woolsey (1817–1874), US Navy commodore
