= Ellen Clegg =

American criminal (born 1841)

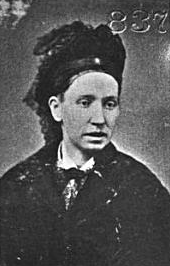
- Born: c. 1841
- Other name: Mary Gray
- Occupation: Criminal
- Known for: New York pickpocket and shoplifter.

Ellen Clegg (c. 1841–unknown) was an American criminal, active in New York, who specialized in pick pocketing and shoplifting. A close associate of Fredericka Mandelbaum, she was well known to authorities in several major cities along with her husband James "Old Jimmy" Clegg and had an extensive arrest record. She was arrested with Tilly Miller, "Black" Lena Kleinschmidt and four other shoplifters in Boston on December 6, 1876; her picture taken by the Boston Police Department for the "Rogues' Gallery". She was later arrested in the city for pick pocketing two years later and sent to the House of Correction.

Returning to New York, she was again arrested with Walter Price (then under the alias Mary Gray) for shoplifting on November 24, 1879. Pleading guilty, she was sentenced to three years in Blackwell's Island by Judge Gildersleeve on December 16 while Price was sent to State Prison.

Clegg returned to Boston after her term expired on April 16, 1882, where she was arrested for shoplifting on May 21, 1883, and sentenced to one year imprisonment in the House of Correction. She was returned to the House of Corrections when she was caught attempting to open a woman's handbag to steal her pocketbook on December 22, 1885, and again given a one-year sentence.
