= Tony Clegg (footballer) =

English footballer (born 1965)

Personal information
- Full name: Tony Clegg
- Date of birth: 8 November 1965 (age 60)
- Place of birth: Keighley, England
- Height: 6 ft 0 in (1.83 m)
- Position: Central defender

Senior career*
Years	Team	Apps	(Gls)
1983–1987	Bradford City	48	(2)
1987–1989	York City	41	(3)
- Chorley
Total		89	(5)
- * Club domestic league appearances and goals

Tony Clegg (born 8 November 1965) is an English former professional footballer who played as a central defender for Bradford City and York City, making 89 appearances in the Football League. He later played non-league football for Chorley. Whilst at Bradford, he won the Football League Division Three title in 1984–85. On the last day of that successful season his day was to turn into a nightmare when 56 spectators were killed in a horrendous stand fire while playing Lincoln City.

After retiring as a player, Clegg moved to Maidstone, and worked in insurance.
