= TwoAYGGAY RNA motif =

- Consensus secondary structure of TwoAYGGAY RNAs

Identifiers
- Symbol: TwoAYGGAY
- Rfam: RF01731

Other data
- RNA type: Cis-regulatory element
- Domain: Bacteria
- PDB structures: PDBe

The TwoAYGGAY RNA motif is a conserved RNA structure identified by bioinformatics. Its name refers to the conserved AYGGAY nucleotide sequence (Y refers to either a C or U nucleotide) found in the motif's two terminal loops (see diagram). The RNAs are found in sequences derived from DNA extracted from uncultivated bacteria present in the human gut, as well as some bacteria in the classes Clostridia and Gammaproteobacteria.
