= Rne-II RNA motif =

rne-II RNA
- Consensus secondary structure of rne-II RNAs

Identifiers
- Symbol: rne-II RNA
- Rfam: RF01756

Other data
- RNA type: Cis-regulatory element
- Domain: Pseudomonadaceae
- PDB structures: PDBe

The rne-II RNA motif is a conserved RNA structure identified using bioinformatics. It is detected only in species classified within the family Pseudomonadaceae, a group of gammaproteobacteria. rne-II RNAs are consistently located in the presumed 5' untranslated regions (5' UTRs) of genes that encode Ribonuclease E (RNase E). The RNase E 5' UTR element is a previously identified RNA structure that is also found in the 5' UTRs of RNase E genes. However, the latter motif is found only in enterobacteria, and the two motifs have apparently unrelated structure. In view of their differences, it was hypothesized that rne-II RNAs fulfill the same functional role as RNase E 5' UTR elements, which is to regulate the levels of RNase E proteins by acting as a substrate for RNase E. Thus, when concentrations of RNase E are high, they will degrade their own messenger RNA.
