= R1162-like plasmid antisense RNA =

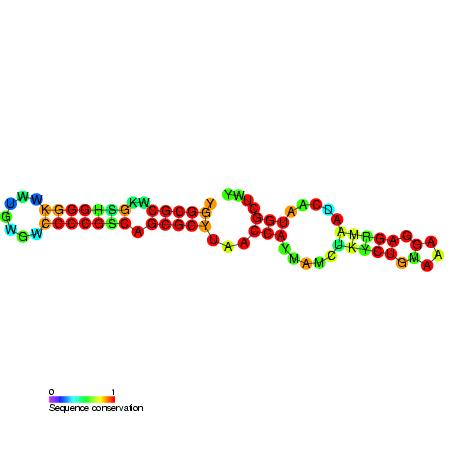
- Predicted secondary structure and sequence conservation of Plasmid_R1162

Identifiers
- Symbol: Plasmid_R1162
- Rfam: RF00043

Other data
- RNA type: Gene; antisense
- Domain(s): Bacteria
- SO: SO:0001263
- PDB structures: PDBe

R1162-like plasmid antisense RNA is a 75-base RNA molecule which negatively regulates the RepI region of the plasmid. The protein product of this gene region, along with another protein, controls the copy number of the 8.75kB R1162 plasmid.

Experimental evidence has shown that in Escherichia coli, when levels of this RNA are decreased, the plasmid copy number of R1162 is increased.
