= Robert Nii Arday Clegg =

Ghanaian lawyer and journalist (born 1976)

Robert Nii Arday Clegg Snr.
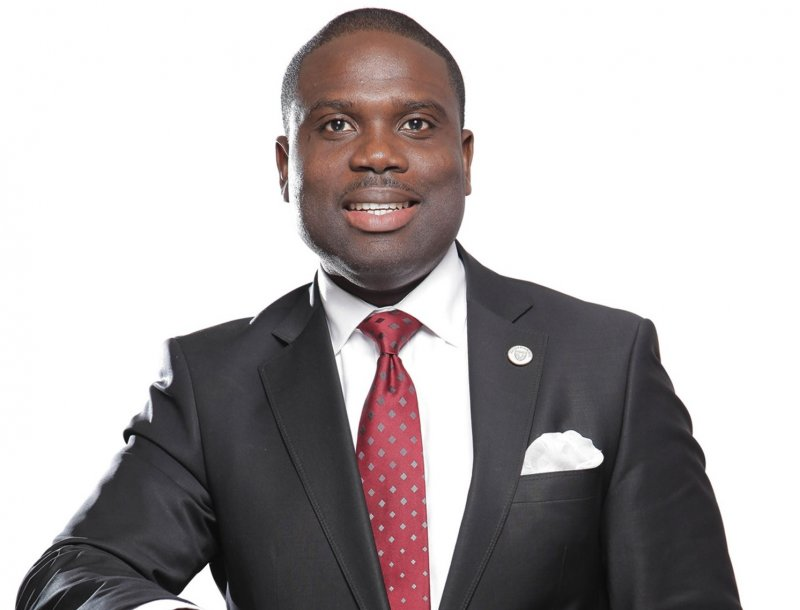
- Born: 22 June 1976 (age 50); Dansoman, Accra, Ghana
- Education: Achimota School; University of Ghana; Harvard University
- Occupations: Lawyer, Television and Radio Journalist
- Years active: 2003–present
- Notable credits: Starr Fm Ghana Morning Show Host (2015–2017).; Multi TV Television Current Affairs and Show Host.
- Spouse: Mabel Afua Yaba Clegg
- Children: David Clegg, Samuel Asafoatse Clegg and Robert Nii Arday Clegg Jnr.
- Website: www.cleggandeverett.com

Robert Nii Arday Clegg Snr (born 22 June 1976) is a Ghanaian lawyer, television and radio journalist. He last worked at Starr 103.5 FM Ghana as a Morning Show host. Clegg left Starr 103.5 FM Ghana in February 2017.

== Early life and education ==
Robert Nii Arday Clegg was born on 22 June 1976 at the Korle-Bu Teaching Hospital in Accra, the capital city of Ghana. His late father, Sam Clegg, was a journalist who is most prominently remembered for his time as the editor of the "Daily Graphic", Ghana's oldest and biggest selling newspaper. His mother, Christiana worked at Akasanoma, the electronics division of the defunct Ghana Industrial Holdings Corporation (GIHOC) and later at the Ghana Commercial Bank (now GCB Bank).

In 1988, at the age of 12, Robert enrolled in the prestigious Achimota School and he stayed at Livingstone House for all seven years of his high school education and obtained his GCE O' and A' Level certificates.

At Achimota, Robert was a keen sportsman, and a member of the 4×100 meters winning team at the inter-house athletics competition in upper six. He played hockey for the school for 6 years and became the captain of the team during his sixth form days. He also won the Hockey Player of the Year Award at the first Sports Awards held in 1993–94.

Robert served as the Boys Classrooms Prefect in sixth form. In Upper Six, he won the Ayi Kwei Armah Prize for Prose (A' Level Literature in English).

Robert entered the University of Ghana, Legon in 1997 and graduated in 2000 with First Class Honours in Political Science with Philosophy. Robert was admitted to the Vice-Chancellor's Honour's List for attaining 6 A grades in the first semester of level 300.

Robert proceeded to the Faculty of Law at the University of Ghana where he won the Bentsi-Enchill Prize for being adjudged the Best Graduating Student in Law. He then enrolled at the Ghana School of Law and was called to the Bar in 2006, winning 4 prizes on the occasion in the Law of Interpretation (2), Taxation and Industrial Law.

Robert obtained a Master of Laws (LL.M.) Degree from Harvard Law School in 2014 and garnered double Honors (H) in the process. At Harvard, Robert was one of 11 students of his graduating class who belonged to the Corporate Law, Finance & Governance Concentration under the directorship of Prof. Mark J. Roe. .

== Law Practice ==
Robert is the Managing Partner at Nii Arday Clegg & Co., a corporate law firm.

== Broadcast career ==
Robert has had nearly two decades' experience as an on and off radio interviewer, morning show host and television personality. He has interviewed sitting and former presidents and vice-presidents, members of parliament, leaders of business, movie stars and sports personalities. He has received a number of nominations and was also adjudged the Television Current Affairs Talk Show Host of the Year at the 2012 RTP Awards. He was a TEDx Accra speaker in 2016.

He started his radio journey in the year 1998 at Radio Univers (the campus radio station of the University of Ghana) and later moved to Radio Gold in 2000 where he hosted The Platform.

Clegg was also nominated as Radio Presenter of the Year 2002, having gained national prominence for interviewing former President Jerry John Rawlings, then Vice-president Prof. John Evans Atta-Mills (the late former President of Ghana), then Member of Parliament John Mahama (later President of Ghana), Emmanuel Bob-Akitani, the main opposition candidate in the Togolese presidential elections of 2003 and 2005 at the time when he was in hiding.

== Awards/nominations ==
- Clegg was nominated and won the RTP Awards in the category of "Television Current Affairs Show Host of the Year" at Multi TV.
- Radio Morning Show Host of the Year 2016, Starrfm Ghana, Nominated

== Personal life ==
In December 2006 Robert married Mabel, a Miss Ghana finalist in 1997 and the winner of Miss Ashanti Region the same year. Mabel worked in the banking industry for 13 years. They have three sons, David, Samuel and Robert Junior.

== Authorship ==
Robert is the author of "10 Strategies for Making Top Grades at the University", a book he self-published to help students in their studies and was launched in Accra in February 2013.
