= Pseudomon-Rho RNA motif =

RNA motif found in species in the genus Pseudomonas and Azotobacter vinelandii

Pseudomon-rho RNA
- Consensus secondary structure of Pseudomon-Rho RNAs

Identifiers
- Symbol: Pseudomon-rho
- Rfam: RF01720

Other data
- RNA type: Cis-regulatory element
- Domain(s): Pseudomonas
- PDB structures: PDBe

The Pseudomon-Rho RNA motif refers to a conserved RNA structure that was discovered using bioinformatics. The RNAs that conform to this motif (see diagram) are found in species within the genus Pseudomonas, as well as the related Azotobacter vinelandii. They are consistently located in what could be the 5' untranslated regions of genes that encode the Rho factor protein, and this arrangement in bacteria suggested that Pseudomon-Rho RNAs might be cis-regulatory elements that regulate concentrations of the Rho protein.
