= JUMPstart RNA motif =

JUMPstart RNA
- Consensus secondary structure of JUMPstart RNAs

Identifiers
- Symbol: JUMPstart RNA
- Rfam: RF01707

Other data
- RNA type: Cis-regulatory element
- Domain(s): Bacteria
- PDB structures: PDBe

The JUMPstart RNA motif describes a conserved RNA-based secondary structure associated with JUMPstart elements. The 39-base-pair JUMPstart sequence describes a conserved element upstream of genes that participate in polysaccharide synthesis. The JUMPstart element has been shown to function as an RNA, and is present in the 5' untranslated regions of the genes it regulates.

JUMPstart sequences include an ops element, which is an acronym for "operon-polarity suppressor" and has the nucleotide consensus GGCGGUAG. The ops element acts in concert with the RfaH protein to improve transcription of genes downstream of the ops element, especially genes far away within long operons.
