= Universal stress protein =

Universal Stress Protein A
- UspA protein structure from Lactobacillus plantarum

Identifiers
- Symbol: lp_3663
- Pfam: PF00582
- Pfam clan: HUP
- InterPro: IPR006016
- SCOP2: 1mjh / SCOPe / SUPFAM
Available protein structures:
- PDB: 3FG9; 1JMV; 3S3T IPR006016 PF00582 (ECOD; PDBsum)
- AlphaFold: IPR006016; PF00582

The universal stress protein (USP) domain is a superfamily of conserved genes which can be found in bacteria, archaea, fungi, protozoa and plants. Proteins containing the domain are induced by many environmental stressors such as nutrient starvation, drought, extreme temperatures, high salinity, and the presence of uncouplers, antibiotics and metals.

In the presence of these stressors, Usp genes are upregulated resulting in large quantities of Usp proteins being produced by the cell. The over production of USP genes allows the organisms to better cope with stresses by largely unknown mechanisms. However, the USPs will alter the expression of a variety of genes that help to cope with stress.

== Function ==
The protein structure of a Universal Stress Protein found in Haemophylus influenzae

The primary function of this superfamily is to protect the organism from environmental stress such as exposure to UV light, which may induce genes containing the USP domain in order to protect the DNA and more generally the cell from further damage. During bacterial starvation the USP genes upregulated will often arrest cell growth and promote its metabolism to adapt to sparse nutrients.

Recent research also suggests proteins containing this domain have functions beyond the realms of dealing with environmental stresses. Nachin et al. demonstrated in Escherichia coli that USPs are involved in actions such as adhesion and motility. The researchers, through means of "knocking out" USP genes known as UspE and UspC, saw results suggesting an inability to swim and completely lack of motility, respectively. Conversely, mutants for genes UspF and UspG were shown to have enhanced swimming abilities. Therefore, mobility is affected both positively and negatively USPs within E. coli. This demonstrates USPs influence throughout the cell could be widespread for a number of reasons.

Additionally, in Halmonas elongate, there is a USP called TeaD has been described as a key regulator in the transport of Ectoine across the cell membrane. This demonstrates how versatile USPs can be. Their function, while primarily encompasses increasing survival during stressful conditions, is not always limited to this.

== Evolution ==
The ubiquitous nature of these proteins suggests the domain evolved in an ancestral species as well as highlighting the clear biological significance these proteins have in order to still be present in the three domains of life. It has been suggested that the USP A domain was part of an ancient protein family. This is due to the similarity in structure between many distantly related organisms. Aravind et al. confirmed these ideas with extensive evolutionary analysis. Aravind suggested that these proteins were part of a much larger protein structural family which was present and diversified in our last universal common ancestor for all extant life. The original function has been suggested to be a nucleotide binding domain which was implicated in signal transduction

== Structure ==
As the USP domain is widespread across many organisms, there is great diversity in the structures of these proteins. For Haemophilus influenzae, its UspA resides in the cytoplasm. The protein forms an asymmetric dimer with characteristic alpha and beta fold structures. There are differences among different bacteria in areas such as ATP binding sites. In this case, UspA does not have ATP binding activity. Generally, USPs form dimers and have domains for nucleotide binding activity. However, as it is such a diverse group, often with little known about the exact structure, it's not possible to comment on each USP. In addition to this, UspA may reside in different areas of the cell. For example, in this case it was in the cytoplasm but for others, it may be in the cell membrane.

== Bacteria ==
Much of the research into USP is done on bacteria, specifically E. coli (Strain K-12). Consequently, much is known about the USP domains in bacteria. In E. coli there are six families of USP domains which are present in more than 1000 different proteins. The six families are Usp A, -C, -D, -E, -F and –G which are triggered by differing environmental insults and often act via varying mechanisms.

UspA is the most commonly studied USP due to its widespread presence within bacterial genomes. UspA is especially implicated in the resistance of a huge number of stressors most notably tetracycline exposure and high temperatures, with the exception of not forming a response to cold shock. It is thought UspA is especially important to the recovery of E. coli following starvation of nutrients. UspA during normal growth conditions does not seem to influence gene expression. However, during stressful conditions such as carbon starvation, UspA has been shown to have a global influence on gene expression. A proposed mechanism for such a change in gene expression is that UspA has been suggested to bind to DNA. When UspA is mutated, E. coli becomes far more vulnerable UV induced DNA damage. It's important to note the USP responses are independent of many other stress responses seen in bacteria such as rpoS.

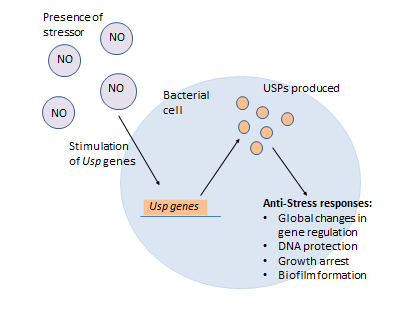
This schematic shows a generalised bacterial response to an environmental stress. In this case, it depicts increased levels of Nitric Oxide which stimulates Usp gene transcription. This results in an anti-stress response from the cell which may or may not include the responses listed within the diagram.

The induction of USP proteins have also been implicated in transitions not only in metabolism or growth but in changes in the colonies' entire phenotype. Bacterial colonies can produce formations known as biofilms. Zhang and colleagues demonstrated that USPs may be involved in the promotion of intertidal biofilms. They observed that during stressful conditions involving metal ions and oxidative stresses that the biofilm phenotype would form. Upon analysis of these biofilms, it could be seen that there was a greatly upregulated level of UspA which Zhang suggests, may be involved with induction of biofilm formation. It is thought UspA may be involved in signalling processes which will upregulate genes involved with biofilm production. With findings such as these, it's beginning to be accepted that USPs are acting using an extremely wide range of mechanisms to ensure cell survival.

=== Regulation ===
In bacteria, the USP genes can be regulated by sigma factors within RNA polymerases. This includes sigma factor σ70 which through binding to a single promoter region, upregulates the transcription of UspA in bacteria. The genes are regulated in a monocistronic fashion. Additionally, UspA, UspC, UspD and UspE are over induced during stationary phase through regulation of RecA. RecA is known for its involvement in the repair of DNA via homologous recombination following damage. Consequently, the four Usp domain genes are thought to be mediating the management or protection of DNA. Whatever the mechanism exhibited by the proteins, one thing which can be concluded is that USP domains are crucial for survival of many bacterial species. Gomes et al. found that UspA deletions in Listeria severely impaired survival as well as listeria's stress response by in vitro and in vivo.

USP domain genes are regulated by a number of proteins involved with growth, DNA repair and cell division. Notable positive regulation occurs via the action of ppGpp, RecA and FtsZ dependent regulatory pathways. USP domain genes are also under the negative control of FadR.

== Plants ==
Plants contain many hundreds of USP domains and genes. These genes are notably induced by environmental stresses such as drought. When a lack of hydration occurs, biochemical changes induced by the actions of USPs ensue. In response to drought, there is a reduction in photosynthetic carbon production as well as a reduction in energy metabolism. These actions are suggested to occur due to their implications in increasing energy conservation. Water limiting conditions are a common environmental pressure which plants will need to cope with on a regular basis, depending on their habitat. These resistant phenotypes will have an increased survival as they allow the plant to conserve energy in times of restricted water which is key to glucose production through photosynthesis.

== Clinical significance ==
=== Tuberculosis ===
Mycobacterium tuberculosis, the infectious agent responsible for tuberculosis (TB), persists within an estimated two billion people. TB is known for its ability to transition into a latent state whereby there is slow growth but high persistence within the mammalian host in structures known as granulomas. These granuloma structures are made up of various cellular materials and immune cells. These include macrophages, neutrophils, cellulose and fats. It has long been proposed that USPs play a significant role in the persistence of TB within the human host. This is due to observations of elevated Usp genes within M. tuberculosis in the latent granuloma stage of the infection.

There are eight types of USPs within M. tuberculosis, all of which have an ATP binding domain. It has been found that within M. tuberculosis, these USPs are regulated by FtsK and FadR. One recent finding shows that the induction of USPs within M. tuberculosis results in USP binding activity with intracellular cAMP which has indirect implications on transcription within the bacteria.

Some of M. tuberculosis' USPs are suggested to be induced by the hypoxic conditions found within the granuloma. Specifically, Rv2623, a type of USP in M. tuberculosis, is induced by the presence of nitric oxide, reactive oxygen species and a downshift in pH. All of these conditions are suggested to be produced by the actions of macrophages which are particularly prevalent within the granuloma structures that are characteristic of TB latent infections. These conditions have been found to upregulate a particular USP gene called rv2623, as well as an additional 50 genes involved in long-term persistence in the mammalian host. It was suggested this USP gene was involved in inducing the latent response within the mammalian host. This stage of the infection is currently chronic with no effective treatments. This makes these kinds of findings extremely valuable.

Rv2623 has an ATP binding domain which if knocked out results in a hyper-virulent form of the bacteria. Understanding these processes aids researchers in their quest to provide effective treatment for those suffering from TB. Rv2623 is also a key biomarker aiding the diagnostic process for TB. Therefore, these USP genes could be crucial for the long-term survival of the bacteria, meaning that there may be potential therapeutic avenues of research to explore in treating latent TB. This comes at a time whereby TB kills many thousands of people a day and is becoming increasing problematic to treat with the rise of multi-drug-resistant TB.

=== Salmonella ===
Similarly, USPs are crucial for the survival of Salmonella, the causative agent in Salmonellosis. In developing countries, food poisoning of this kind is a potentially life-threatening condition. The USPs have influence in growth arrest, stress responses and virulence. UspA is induced by metabolic, oxidative and temperature related stress. In these conditions UspA is over produced through the transcriptional regulation by ppGpp and RecA. These responses have been suggested to be involved in the protection of DNA. As a result, UspA aids Salmonella to resist stressors produced by the mammalian immune system assisting in survival and hence, pathogenicity. When UspA is inactivated in Salmonella, the mutants die prematurely, demonstrating how crucial these proteins are to survival and persistence. Again, understanding these processes may aid researchers in developing effective drugs to treat these infections.
