= GOLLD RNA motif =

GOLLD
- Consensus secondary structure and sequence conservation of the 3' half of Giant, ornate, lake- and Lactobacillales-derived (GOLLD) RNA

Identifiers
- Symbol: GOLLD
- Rfam: RF02032

Other data
- RNA type: Gene
- SO: SO:0001263
- PDB structures: PDBe

Giant, Ornate, Lake- and Lactobacillales-Derived (GOLLD) RNA is a conserved RNA structure present in bacteria. GOLLD RNAs were originally detected based on metagenome sequences of DNA isolated from Lake Gatun in Panama. However, they are known to be present in at least eight strains of cultivated bacteria. GOLLD RNAs are extraordinarily large compared to other RNAs with a conserved, complex secondary structure, and average roughly 800 nucleotides. Such large, complex RNAs are often ribozymes, although the biochemical function of GOLLD RNAs remains unknown. The discovery of large RNAs like GOLLD RNAs among bacteria that are mostly uncultivated under laboratory conditions suggests that many other unusually large RNAs might be found in bacteria that have not yet been studied.

The GOLLD RNA in Lactobacillus brevis ATCC 367 was studied experimentally. This GOLLD RNA is apparently encoded by a prophage, and its transcription is increased during the phage lytic cycle. Therefore, this GOLLD RNA presumably serves a function that is useful to the phage during this process. GOLLD RNAs are often located near transfer RNAs (tRNAs), and in some cases a tRNA is predicted to be inside the GOLLD RNA structure itself. However, the biological reason underlying this association is not understood.

A more recently discovered large bacterial RNA, named the ROOL RNA motif, shares properties with GOLLD RNAs. In addition to the relatively large size and high degree of structural complexity of these RNA motifs, they both are only sometimes located in prophages and often located nearby to tRNAs. However, the sequence and structures of GOLLD and ROOL RNAs are not related.

The Rfam model of GOLLD RNA uses only the 3' half of GOLLD, as this region of the full RNA is highly consistent in its structure.
