= MraW RNA motif =

mraW RNA
- Consensus secondary structure of mraW RNAs

Identifiers
- Symbol: mraW RNA
- Rfam: RF01746

Other data
- RNA type: Cis-regulatory element
- Domain(s): Actinomycetota
- PDB structures: PDBe

The mraW RNA motif is a conserved, structured RNA found in certain bacteria. Specifically, it is predicted in many, though not all, species of actinobacteria, and especially within the genus Mycobacterium. Structurally, the motif consists of a hairpin with a highly conserved terminal loop sequence (red nucleotides in diagram at right). mraW RNAs are consistently in the presumed 5' untranslated regions of mraW genes. These mraW genes likely form operons with immediately downstream ftsI genes, and multiple types of mur genes. These genes are associated with peptidoglycan synthesis, and it was hypothesized that the mraW RNA motif might regulate these genes.
