= Ocean-V RNA motif =

Ocean-V RNA
- Consensus secondary structure of Ocean-V RNAs

Identifiers
- Symbol: Ocean-V
- Rfam: RF01714

Other data
- RNA type: sRNA
- Domain: Ocean metagenome
- PDB structures: PDBe

The Ocean-V RNA motif is a conserved RNA structure discovered using bioinformatics. Only a few Ocean-V RNA sequences have been detected, all in sequences derived from DNA that was extracted from uncultivated bacteria found in ocean water. As of 2010, no Ocean-V RNA has been detected in any known, cultivated organism.
