= L. murrayi =

L. murrayi may refer to:

- Listeria murrayi, formerly a species of bacteria, now a subspecies of Listeria grayi
- Lithodes murrayi, the subantarctic stone crab, a species of king crab
- Lysiana murrayi, a species of shrub in the family Loranthaceae
