= Listeria marthii =

Scientific classification
- Domain: Bacteria
- Kingdom: Bacillati
- Phylum: Bacillota
- Class: Bacilli
- Order: Bacillales
- Family: Listeriaceae
- Genus: Listeria
- Species: L. marthii

Binomial name
- Listeria marthii Graves et al. 2010

Species of bacterium

Listeria marthii is a species of bacteria. It is a Gram-positive, motile, facultatively anaerobic, non-spore-forming bacillus. It is non-pathogenic, and non-hemolytic. The species was first isolated from Finger Lakes National Forest in New York. It is named after Elmer H. Marth, a researcher of L. monocytogenes, and was first published in 2010. L. marthii was the first new species of Listeria proposed since 1985.

Listeria marthii has mainly been isolated from a specific area in the Finger Lakes National Forest. However, L. marthii strains may be mischaracterized as L. innocua due to biochemical similarities between the two species.
