= Listeria seeligeri =

Scientific classification
- Domain: Bacteria
- Kingdom: Bacillati
- Phylum: Bacillota
- Class: Bacilli
- Order: Bacillales
- Family: Listeriaceae
- Genus: Listeria
- Species: L. seeligeri

Binomial name
- Listeria seeligeri Rocourt et al. 1983

Species of bacterium

Listeria seeligeri is a Gram-positive, facultatively anaerobic, motile, nonspore-forming, bacillus-shaped species of bacteria. L. seeligeri is not considered pathogenic in humans. The species was first isolated from plants, soil, and animal feces in Europe, was first proposed in 1983, and is named after Heinz P. R. Seeliger. Seeliger first proposed the species L. ivanovii and L. innocua, and published extensively on members of the genus Listeria.

L. seeligeri is one of only three species of Listeria that is hemolytic, along with L. ivanovii and L. monocytogenes.
