= Brochothrix campestris =

Scientific classification
- Domain: Bacteria
- Kingdom: Bacillati
- Phylum: Bacillota
- Class: Bacilli
- Order: Bacillales
- Family: Listeriaceae
- Genus: Brochothrix
- Species: B. campestris

Binomial name
- Brochothrix campestris Talon et al. 1988

Type strain
- S3

Bacterium

Brochothrix campestris is bacteria involved in the spoilage of meat. When it grows in food, the metabolic activities result in the production of metabolites associated with off-odors. B. campestris was first described in 1988 and was named from the Latin adjective campestris meaning field, campestris – from the field, because B. ’campestris was originally isolated from a soil sample. Compared to the closely related B. thermosphacta, B. campestris is very rarely found from food samples.
