= Listeria cornellensis =

Scientific classification
- Domain: Bacteria
- Kingdom: Bacillati
- Phylum: Bacillota
- Class: Bacilli
- Order: Bacillales
- Family: Listeriaceae
- Genus: Listeria
- Species: L. cornellensis

Binomial name
- Listeria cornellensis den Bakker et al. 2014

Species of bacterium

Listeria cornellensis is a species of bacteria. It is a Gram-positive, facultatively anaerobic, non-motile, non-spore-forming bacillus. It is non-pathogenic. The species was named after Cornell University, and its discovery was first published in 2014.

Listeria cornellensis is phenotypically similar to Listeria grandensis, but is genetically distinct.
