= Listeria aquatica =

Scientific classification
- Domain: Bacteria
- Kingdom: Bacillati
- Phylum: Bacillota
- Class: Bacilli
- Order: Bacillales
- Family: Listeriaceae
- Genus: Listeria
- Species: L. aquatica

Binomial name
- Listeria aquatica den Bakker et al. 2014

Species of bacterium

Listeria aquatica is a Gram-positive, facultatively anaerobic, nonmotile, non-spore-forming rod-shaped species of bacteria. It is nonpathogenic. It was discovered from running water in Florida, and was first described in 2014. Its name comes from Latin, "found in water, aquatic".

Listeria aquatica is the only member of genus Listeria that can ferment maltose. It is also the only nonmotile Listeria that can ferment D-tagatose.
