= Listeria newyorkensis =

Scientific classification
- Domain: Bacteria
- Kingdom: Bacillati
- Phylum: Bacillota
- Class: Bacilli
- Order: Bacillales
- Family: Listeriaceae
- Genus: Listeria
- Species: L. newyorkensis

Binomial name
- Listeria newyorkensis Weller et al. 2015

Species of bacterium

Listeria newyorkensis is a species of bacteria. It is a Gram-positive, facultatively anaerobic, non-motile, non-spore-forming bacillus. It is non-pathogenic and non-hemolytic. It was discovered in a seafood processing plant in New York, and was first published in 2015.

Listeria newyorkensis "(c)an be differentiated from other species of the genus Listeria by the absence of the α-mannosidase reaction, inability to acidify D-arabitol, and ability to acidify D-ribose, D-galactose and L-arabinose."
