= Listeria grandensis =

Scientific classification
- Domain: Bacteria
- Kingdom: Bacillati
- Phylum: Bacillota
- Class: Bacilli
- Order: Bacillales
- Family: Listeriaceae
- Genus: Listeria
- Species: L. grandensis

Binomial name
- Listeria grandensis den Bakker et al. 2014

Species of bacterium

Listeria grandensis is a species of bacteria. It is a Gram-positive, facultatively anaerobic, non-motile, non-spore-forming bacillus. It is non-pathongenic and non-hemolytic. The species was discovered in and named after Grand County, Colorado, and its discovery was first published in 2014.

Listeria grandensis is phenotypically similar to Listeria cornellensis, but L. grandensis shows temperature-dependent acidification of L-rhamnose.
