= Listeria goaensis =

Scientific classification
- Domain: Bacteria
- Kingdom: Bacillati
- Phylum: Bacillota
- Class: Bacilli
- Order: Bacillales
- Family: Listeriaceae
- Genus: Listeria
- Species: L. goaensis

Binomial name
- Listeria goaensis Doijad et al. 2018

Species of bacterium

Listeria goaensis is of Gram-positive bacteria from the genus Listeria. The type strain of the species was isolated from the sediment of estuarine mangrove swamp of the Mandovi river, Goa, India. The species shows weak hemolysis on 5% sheep and horse-blood agar plates.

In 2018, two samples from mangrove swamps in Goa, India were tested and found to contain Listeria-like cultures. 16S rRNA gene sequences showed 93.7–99.7% nucleotide identity to other Listeria species. Other resemblances to Listeria species included (despite specific differences) the overall fatty acid composition. However, various differences from other Listeria species (as indicated by WGS-based average nucleotide identity and in silico DNA–DNA hybridization values) suggest that they should be considered to be specimens from a new, diverging Listeria species. It was suggested that the name Listeria goaensis sp. nov. be created for a type strain ILCC801T.
