= Listeria rocourtiae =

Scientific classification
- Domain: Bacteria
- Kingdom: Bacillati
- Phylum: Bacillota
- Class: Bacilli
- Order: Bacillales
- Family: Listeriaceae
- Genus: Listeria
- Species: L. rocourtiae

Binomial name
- Listeria rocourtiae Leclercq et al. 2010

Species of bacterium

Listeria rocourtiae is a species of bacteria. It is a Gram-positive, facultatively anaerobic, motile, non-spore-forming bacillus. It is non-pathongenic and non-hemolytic. The species was first isolated from pre-cut lettuce in Salzburg, Austria in 2002. It is named in honor of Jocelyne Rocourt, "whose work had a major impact on the taxonomy of the genus Listeria."
