= Listeria thailandensis =

Scientific classification
- Domain: Bacteria
- Kingdom: Bacillati
- Phylum: Bacillota
- Class: Bacilli
- Order: Bacillales
- Family: Listeriaceae
- Genus: Listeria
- Species: L. thailandensis

Binomial name
- Listeria thailandensis Leclercq et al. 2019

Species of bacterium

Listeria thailandensis is a species of bacteria. It is a Gram-positive, facultatively anaerobic, non-motile, non-spore-forming bacillus. It is non-pathogenic and non-hemolytic. It was isolated from a fried chicken sample from Thailand. The species was first proposed in 2019, and the species name refers to the country from which it was first isolated.

The optimum growth temperature for L. thailandensis is 30-37 °C; it can grow in the 22-42 °C range.
