= Brochothrix thermosphacta =

Scientific classification
- Domain: Bacteria
- Kingdom: Bacillati
- Phylum: Bacillota
- Class: Bacilli
- Order: Bacillales
- Family: Listeriaceae
- Genus: Brochothrix
- Species: B. thermosphacta

Binomial name
- Brochothrix thermosphacta Sneath and Jones 1976

Type strain
- SW26

Bacterium

Brochothrix thermosphacta is one of the major bacteria involved in the spoilage of meat and seafood. When it grows in food, the metabolic activities result in the production of metabolites associated with off-odors. B. thermosphacta was originally classified as Microbacterium thermosphactum by McLean and Sulzbacher 1953 and was named from the Greek adjective thermê meaning heat and the Greek adjective sphaktos meaning slain, thermosphacta - killed by heat, because M. thermosphacta was unusually heat sensitive compared to other species of Microbacterium. B. thermosphacta can grow between 1–30 °C and grow up to 8% salt. Brochothrix thermosphacta can be selectively isolated from e.g. food samples by isolation on STAA agar.
