= Guavanin 2 =

Antimicrobial peptide

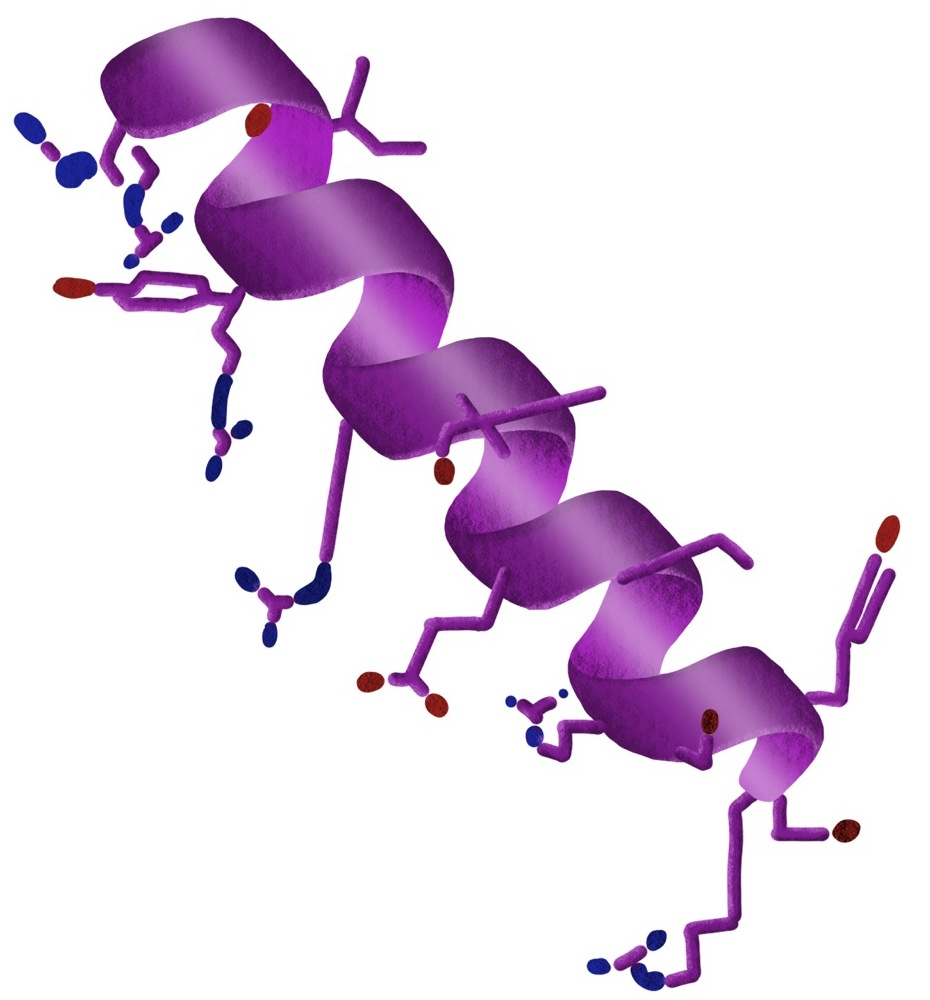

Names
- IUPAC name L-ArginyL-L-glutaminyL-L-tyrosyL-L-methionyL-L-arginyL-L-glutaminyL-L-isoleucyL-L-α-glutamyL-L-glutaminyL-L-alanyL-L-leucyL-L-arginyL-L-tyrosylglycyL-L-tyrosyL-L-arginyL-L-isoleucyL-L-seryL-L-arginyL-L-arginine

Identifiers
CAS Number	2375362-11-9
3D model (JSmol)	Interactive image
- InChI: InChI=1S/C114H187N41O30S/c1-9-58(5)88(155-101(177)74(37-41-85(118)162)146-94(170)68(18-12-45-132-110(121)122)141-99(175)76(43-50-186-8)147-104(180)81(54-63-27-33-66(159)34-28-63)152-98(174)73(36-40-84(117)161)140-91(167)67(115)17-11-44-131-109(119)120)106(182)148-75(38-42-87(164)165)97(173)145-72(35-39-83(116)160)93(169)138-60(7)90(166)150-78(51-57(3)4)102(178)142-70(20-14-47-134-112(125)126)96(172)151-79(52-61-23-29-64(157)30-24-61)92(168)137-55-86(163)139-80(53-62-25-31-65(158)32-26-62)103(179)143-71(21-15-48-135-113(127)128)100(176)154-89(59(6)10-2)107(183)153-82(56-156)105(181)144-69(19-13-46-133-111(123)124)95(171)149-77(108(184)185)22-16-49-136-114(129)130/h23-34,57-60,67-82,88-89,156-159H,9-22,35-56,115H2,1-8H3,(H2,116,160)(H2,117,161)(H2,118,162)(H,137,168)(H,138,169)(H,139,163)(H,140,167)(H,141,175)(H,142,178)(H,143,179)(H,144,181)(H,145,173)(H,146,170)(H,147,180)(H,148,182)(H,149,171)(H,150,166)(H,151,172)(H,152,174)(H,153,183)(H,154,176)(H,155,177)(H,164,165)(H,184,185)(H4,119,120,131)(H4,121,122,132)(H4,123,124,133)(H4,125,126,134)(H4,127,128,135)(H4,129,130,136)/t58-,59-,60-,67-,68-,69-,70-,71-,72-,73-,74-,75-,76-,77-,78-,79-,80-,81-,82-,88-,89-/m0/s1 Key: CQRKMYKSJDUYDD-KRVUYVGDSA-N
- SMILES: [C@H](CC1=CC=C(O)C=C1)(C(N[C@H](C(N[C@H](C(N[C@H](C(N[C@H](C(N[C@H](C(N[C@H](C(N[C@H](C(N[C@H](C(N[C@H](C(N[C@@H](CC2=CC=C(O)C=C2)C(NCC(N[C@@H](CC3=CC=C(O)C=C3)C(N[C@H](C(N[C@H](C(N[C@H](C(N[C@H](C(N[C@@H](CCCNC(=N)N)C(O)=O)=O)CCCNC(=N)N)=O)CO)=O)[C@H](CC)C)=O)CCCNC(=N)N)=O)=O)=O)=O)CCCNC(=N)N)=O)CC(C)C)=O)C)=O)CCC(N)=O)=O)CCC(O)=O)=O)[C@H](CC)C)=O)CCC(N)=O)=O)CCCNC(=N)N)=O)CCSC)=O)NC([C@@H](NC([C@H](CCCNC(=N)N)N)=O)CCC(N)=O)=O

Properties
Chemical formula	C_{114}H_{187}N_{41}O_{30}S
Molar mass	2644.07 g·mol^{−1}
- Except where otherwise noted, data are given for materials in their standard state (at 25 °C [77 °F], 100 kPa). Infobox references

Guavanin 2 is a synthetic antimicrobial peptide (AMP) designed using an algorithm to optimize the effectiveness of Pg-AMP1, a glycine-rich peptide found in the genome of guavas (Psidium guajava). It was originally designed in 2018 by Porto et al. in Nature Communications. Guavanin 2 has shown activity against several Gram-negative bacteria, by adopting an α-helical secondary structure in hydrophobic environments while also exhibiting a low toxicity against mammalian cells. These properties have opened the door for the peptide as possible treatment for bacterial infections, particularly antibiotic-resistant strands.

== Background ==
Antimicrobial peptides are part of the innate immune system of countless organisms. Plant AMPs such as defensins, thionins, and cyclotides have been investigated as alternatives to conventional antibiotics, especially with increasing rates of antimicrobial resistance. However, during drug development many plant AMPs create challenges due to complex post-translational modifications, disulfide bonding, and/or relatively low potency. By using computational peptide design, researchers may be able to overcome some of these limitations by efficiently exploring mutations not produced by natural evolution.

== Discovery and design ==
Guavanin 2 was created using a genetic algorithm, a computational optimization of biological evolution. The algorithm operated on fragments of Pg-AMP1 and optimized based on two parameters: Hydrophobic moment and Helix propensity. Hydrophobic moment is a measure of amphipathic behavior which is typically associated with α-helix formation. Helix propensity is based on thermodynamic values derived from protein folding studies. Selection, crossover, and mutation steps were used to generate a library of synthetic peptides, guavanins. Most guavanins were found to be rich in arginine, providing a strong cationic charge. Guavanin 2 uses tyrosine as opposed to other hydrophobic residues like leucine, isoleucine, or phenylalanine to form its hydrophobic face. Guavanin 2 retains a single glycine residue, inherited from Pg-AMP1, and contains only four mutations compared to the parent fragments.

=== Structure ===
Guavanin 2 is remains unstructured in aqueous buffer but undergoes a coil-to-helix transition in the presence of dodecylphosphocholine (DPC) micelles, which emulate lipid bilayers found in membranes. Circular dichroism spectroscopy demonstrates α-helical signals characterized by minima near 208 nm and 222 nm. Nuclear magnetic resonance spectroscopy of guavanin 2 in DPC micelles revealed a continuous α-helix from residues 2-16, a hydrophobic cluster involving methionine, isoleucine, and leucine residues, and stable side-chain hydrogen bonds involving glutamine and arginine. These amino acids also create a positively charged surface that favors electrostatic interactions with negatively charged phospholipids.

== Antimicrobial activity ==
=== Range of organisms ===
Guavanin 2 exhibits selective activity toward certain species of Gram-negative bacteria including:

- Escherichia coli
- Acinetobacter baumannii
- Pseudomonas aeruginosa
- Klebsiella pneumoniae (limited activity)

Its activity against Staphylococcus aureus, Streptococcus pyogenes, and Listeria ivanovii, is substantially weaker. Activity against fungi such as Candida albicans and Candida parapsilosis is minimal. Relative to classical and more understood AMPs such as melittin, guavanin 2 displays slower bactericidal kinetics, higher selectivity, and lower cytotoxicity.

=== Mechanism ===
Unlike many AMPs that cause rapid membrane depolarization, guavanin 2 induces membrane hyperpolarization. This hyperpolarization is due to the large cationic charge found on the structure and these charges are what give the peptide the antimicrobial properties. Experiments using fluorescent dyes showed slow increases in membrane permeability, a reduction in fluorescence of polarity-dependent dye indicating hyperpolarization, and morphological changes observed in a scanning electron microscope. Hyperpolarization may contribute to cell death by disturbing metabolic processes dependent on membrane stability like the electron transport chain and ATP synthesis that take place in the mitochondria. If the mechanism of death were depolarization the signal of the fluorescent dyes would have increased during the experiments.

== Applications ==
Similar to other AMPs, guavanin 2 could see further development to later become a means to eliminate bacterial infections in humans or other animals. Another takeaway from the development of guavanin 2 in Porto et al. is using the algorithm on other possible AMPs. This could improve the toxicity and/or specificity of other AMPs currently being researched. The algorithm is an easily applied tool that may allow for researchers to speed up the process of discovering and designing effective AMPs.
