= Streptomycin thallous acetate actidione agar =

Selective culture medium for Brochothrix thermosphacta

'Streptomycin thallous acetate actidione agar, often abbreviated STAA, is a selective culture medium designed to favor the growth of Brochothrix thermosphacta for lab study. This medium was developed in 1966, by George Alan Gardner.

== Typical composition ==
STAA agar typically contains (w/v):

- 2.0% peptone
- 0.2% yeast extract
- 0.75% glycerol
- 0.1% dipotassium hydrogen phosphate
- 0.1% magnesium sulfate heptahydrate
- 1.3% agar
- pH adjusted to 7.0 at 25 °C

After autoclaving at 121 °C for 15 minutes, the media is cooled to 50 °C and additives are added:

- 0.05% Streptomycin sulphate
- 0.005% Thallous acetate

STAA contains streptomycin sulphate, which inhibits some Gram-positive organisms and most Gram-negatives at higher concentrations, whilst Brochothrix thermosphacta remains resistant. Thallous acetate inhibits most yeasts as well as many aerobic and facultatively anaerobic bacteria.

The test sample is homogenized in sterile 0.1% peptone water and diluted. 0.1ml volumes are transferred to the agar plate and spread across the surface. The agar plates are incubated at 22 °C for 48 hours aerobically. Typical colonies of Brochothrix thermosphacta will grow as straw-colored colonies, 0.5-1.0mm in diameter. Some Pseudomonads can be able to grow on STAA and may be differentiated from Brochothrix thermosphacta by performing an oxidase test.
