= Listeria fleischmannii =

Scientific classification
- Domain: Bacteria
- Kingdom: Bacillati
- Phylum: Bacillota
- Class: Bacilli
- Order: Bacillales
- Family: Listeriaceae
- Genus: Listeria
- Species: L. fleischmannii

Binomial name
- Listeria fleischmannii Bertsch et al. 2013

Species of bacterium

Listeria fleischmannii is a species of bacteria. It is a gram-positive, facultatively anaerobic, non-motile, non-spore-forming bacillus. It is non-pathogenic and non-hemolytic. The species was first isolated in 2006 in Switzerland from hard cheese. The species is named after Wilhelm Fleischmann, a pioneer in the research of dairy products.

Listeria fleischmannii can be differentiated from other species of Listeria by its ability to ferment both D-mannitol and D-xylose.
