= Listeria riparia =

Scientific classification
- Domain: Bacteria
- Kingdom: Bacillati
- Phylum: Bacillota
- Class: Bacilli
- Order: Caryophanales
- Family: Listeriaceae
- Genus: Listeria
- Species: L. riparia

Binomial name
- Listeria riparia den Bakker et al. 2014

Species of bacterium

Listeria riparia is a species of bacteria. It is a Gram-positive, facultatively anaerobic, non-motile, non-spore-forming bacillus. It is non-pathogenic. Its name refers to the riparian zone, and its discovery was first published in 2014.

Listeria riparia "(c)an be differentiated from other non-motile species of the genus Listeria by a combination of α-mannosidase activity and the ability to acidify L-rhamnose, D-galactose and L-arabinose."
