= Listeria floridensis =

Scientific classification
- Domain: Bacteria
- Kingdom: Bacillati
- Phylum: Bacillota
- Class: Bacilli
- Order: Bacillales
- Family: Listeriaceae
- Genus: Listeria
- Species: L. floridensis

Binomial name
- Listeria floridensis den Bakker et al. 2014

Species of bacterium

Listeria floridensis is a species of bacteria. It is a Gram-positive, facultatively anaerobic, non-motile, non-spore-forming bacillus. It is non-pathongenic and non-hemolytic. The species was discovered in and named after Florida, and its discovery was first published in 2014.

Listeria floridensis is the only non-motile member of genus Listeria that is unable to reduce nitrate.
