= Listeria booriae =

Scientific classification
- Domain: Bacteria
- Kingdom: Bacillati
- Phylum: Bacillota
- Class: Bacilli
- Order: Bacillales
- Family: Listeriaceae
- Genus: Listeria
- Species: L. booriae

Binomial name
- Listeria booriae Weller et al. 2015

Species of bacterium

Listeria booriae is a Gram-positive, facultatively anaerobic, nonmotile, non-spore-forming rod-shaped species of bacteria. It is not pathogenic and nonhemolytic. It was discovered in a dairy processing plant in the Northeastern United States, and was first described in 2015. The species name honors "Kathryn Boor, a United States food scientist, for her contribution to the understanding of the biology of Listeria."
