= Listeria costaricensis =

Scientific classification
- Domain: Bacteria
- Kingdom: Bacillati
- Phylum: Bacillota
- Class: Bacilli
- Order: Bacillales
- Family: Listeriaceae
- Genus: Listeria
- Species: L. costaricensis

Binomial name
- Listeria costaricensis Núñez-Montero et al. 2018

Species of bacterium

Listeria costaricensis (cos.ta.ri.cen′sis N.L. fem. adj. costaricensis ‘from Costa Rica’, the country from where the type strain was isolated) is a species of bacterium of the genus Listeria. It is a Gram-stain-positive, rod-shaped bacterium, non-spore-forming and facultatively anaerobic. Colonies are opaque, yellow-pigmented (atypical of Listeria species), with a flat shape and entire margin on BHI. Growth occurs at 22–42 °C, with optimal growth at 30–37 °C. It has motility at 37 °C. The bacteria is negative for catalase, haemolysis and nitrite reduction. It can be differentiated from other species of the genus Listeria by the absence of catalase reaction, production of acid from potassium 5-ketogluconate and production of a yellow pigment on BHI. It is presumably non-pathongenic due to the lack of haemolysis and pathogenicity genes on its genome.

The species was isolated in August 2015 from the drainage system of a food-processing plant in the province of Alajuela, northern Costa Rica, through to a joint investigation of scientists from the Costa Rica Institute of Technology (ITCR) in Cartago, Costa Rica and researchers from the Pasteur Institute, Paris, France. The discovery was first published in 2018.
