= Listeria weihenstephanensis =

Scientific classification
- Domain: Bacteria
- Kingdom: Bacillati
- Phylum: Bacillota
- Class: Bacilli
- Order: Bacillales
- Family: Listeriaceae
- Genus: Listeria
- Species: L. weihenstephanensis

Binomial name
- Listeria weihenstephanensis Halter et al. 2013

Species of bacterium

Listeria weihenstephanensis is a species of bacteria. It is a Gram-positive, facultatively anaerobic, non-motile, non-spore-forming bacillus. It is non-pathongenic and non-hemolytic. It was discovered in a Lemna trisulca plant in a pond in Bavaria, Germany. The species name reflects the region in which it was first isolated, and was first published in 2013.
