= Listeria welshimeri =

Scientific classification
- Domain: Bacteria
- Kingdom: Bacillati
- Phylum: Bacillota
- Class: Bacilli
- Order: Bacillales
- Family: Listeriaceae
- Genus: Listeria
- Species: L. welshimeri

Binomial name
- Listeria welshimeri Rocourt et al. 1983

Species of bacterium

Listeria welshimeri is a species of bacteria. It is a Gram-positive, facultatively anaerobic, motile, non-spore-forming bacillus. It is non-pathogenic and non-hemolytic. The species was first isolated from decayed vegetation in the United States by H. J. Welshimer, after whom the species is named. The species was first proposed in 1983.
