= Thallium(III) acetate =

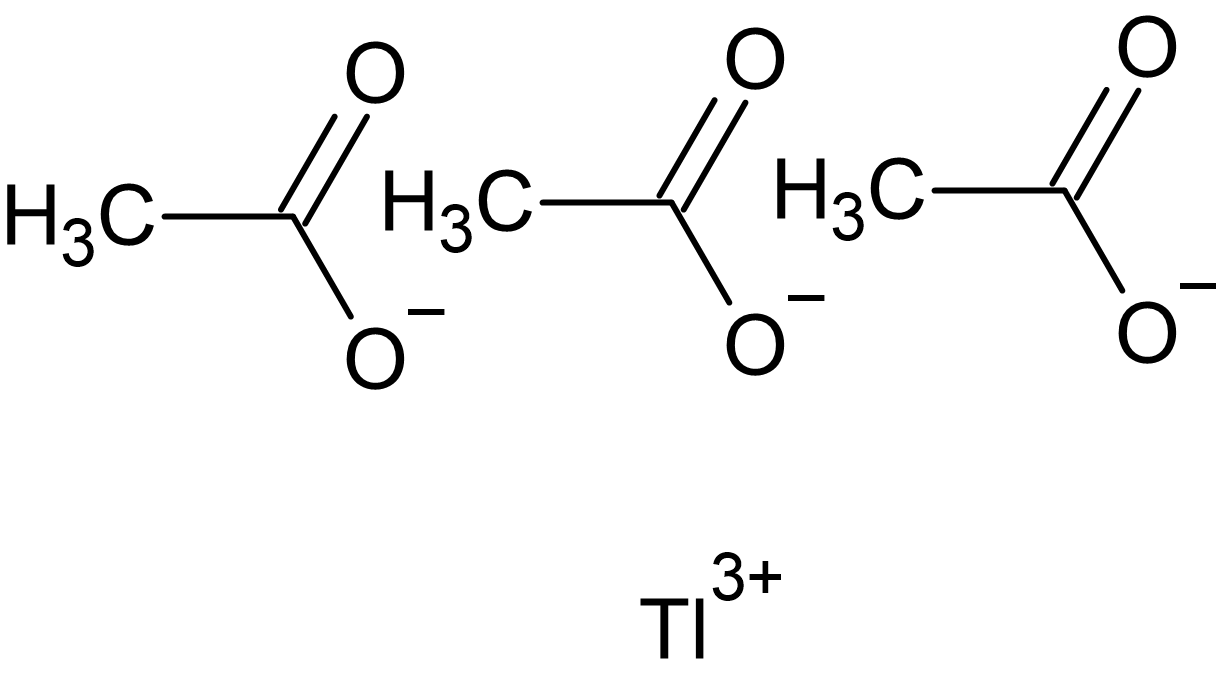

Names
- IUPAC name Thallium(III) acetate

Identifiers
| CAS Number | 2570-63-0 |
| 3D model (JSmol) | Interactive image |
| ChemSpider | 10667701 |
| ECHA InfoCard | 100.018.104 |
| EC Number | 219-913-2 |
| PubChem CID | 16685266 |
| UNII | 24Z9A6MS8G |
| CompTox Dashboard (EPA) | DTXSID20890561 |
- InChI: InChI=1S/3C2H4O2.Tl/c3*1-2(3)4;/h3*1H3,(H,3,4);/q;;;+3/p-3 Key: SMRRYUGQTFYZGD-UHFFFAOYSA-K
- SMILES: CC(=O)[O-].CC(=O)[O-].CC(=O)[O-].[Tl+3]

Properties
| Chemical formula | Tl(C_{2}H_{3}O_{2})_{3} |
| Molar mass | 381.52 |
- Except where otherwise noted, data are given for materials in their standard state (at 25 °C [77 °F], 100 kPa). Infobox references

Thallium(III) acetate is one of two acetate salts of thallium, with the chemical formula Tl(CH_{3}COO)_{3}. Thallium acetate is a toxic depilatory and rat poison. Thallium acetate was widely marketed as Koremlu during the 1930s. Women who suffered the side effects of the popular product sued the company, forcing it to bankruptcy in 1932. A dose of 8 mg/kg will cause acute poisoning, and the minimum lethal dose for adults is 12 mg/kg.

== Preparation ==
Thallium acetate can be obtained by reacting 80% acetic acid with thallium(III) oxide, and the product crystallizes in acetic anhydride.

== Properties ==
Anhydrous thallium(III) acetate crystallises in the monoclinic system with space group C2/c. The unit cell dimensions are a = 15.54 Å b = 8.630 Å and c = 7.848 Å with β = 113.92°. There are four formula per unit cell. and density is 2.57. Three acetate ions are chellated to each thallium ion.

Thallium(III) acetate monohydrate also crystallises in the monoclinic system with space group C2/c, a = 9.311 Å, b = 14.341 Å, c = 9.198 Å, β = 119.69 °. Unit cell volume is V = 1067.0 Å^{3} Z = 4, density is 2.49.
