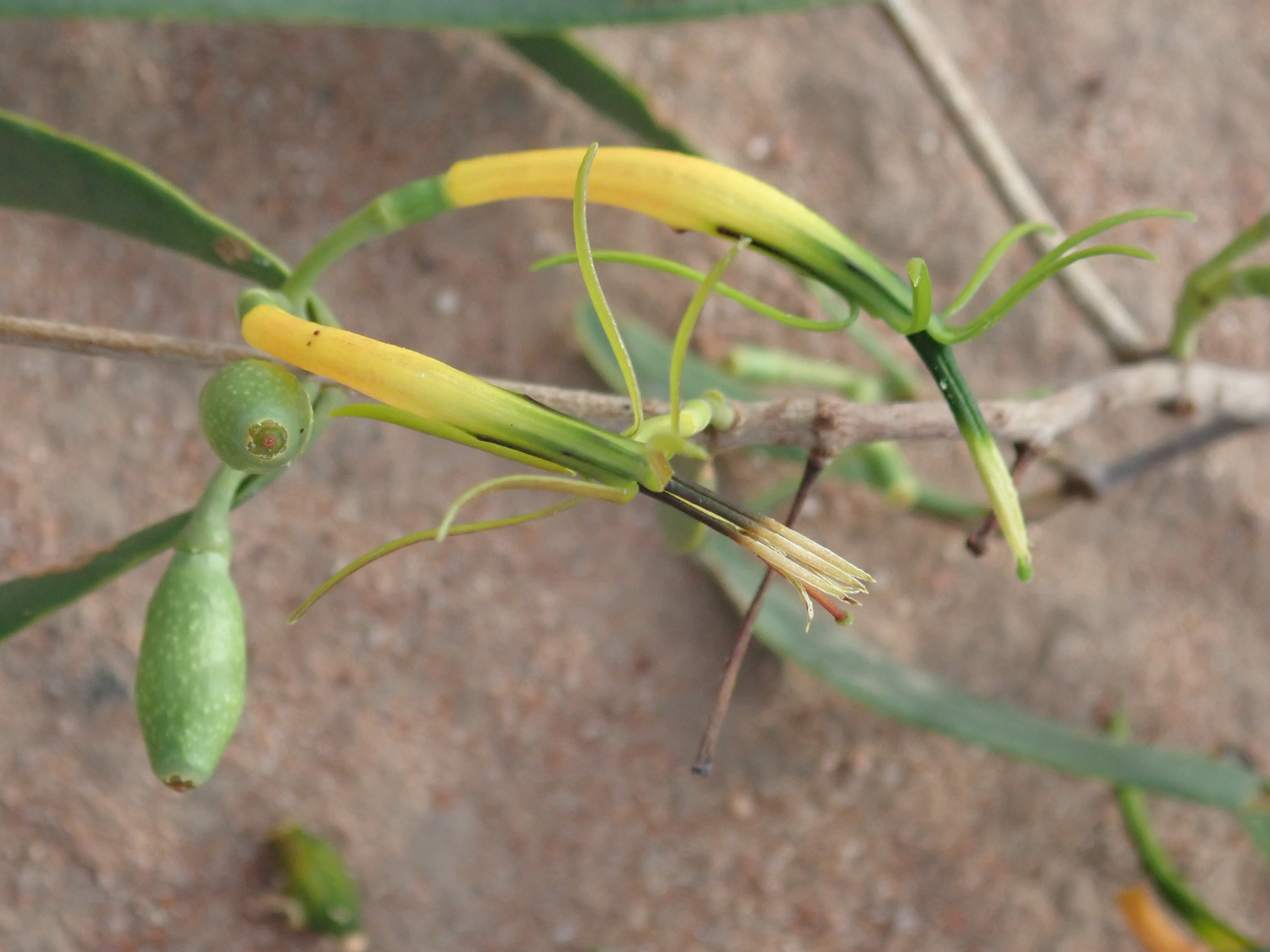
- Lysiana subfalcata

Scientific classification
- Kingdom: Plantae
- Clade: Tracheophytes
- Clade: Angiosperms
- Clade: Eudicots
- Order: Santalales
- Family: Loranthaceae
- Genus: Lysiana
- Species: L. subfalcata

Binomial name
- Lysiana subfalcata (Hook.) Barlow
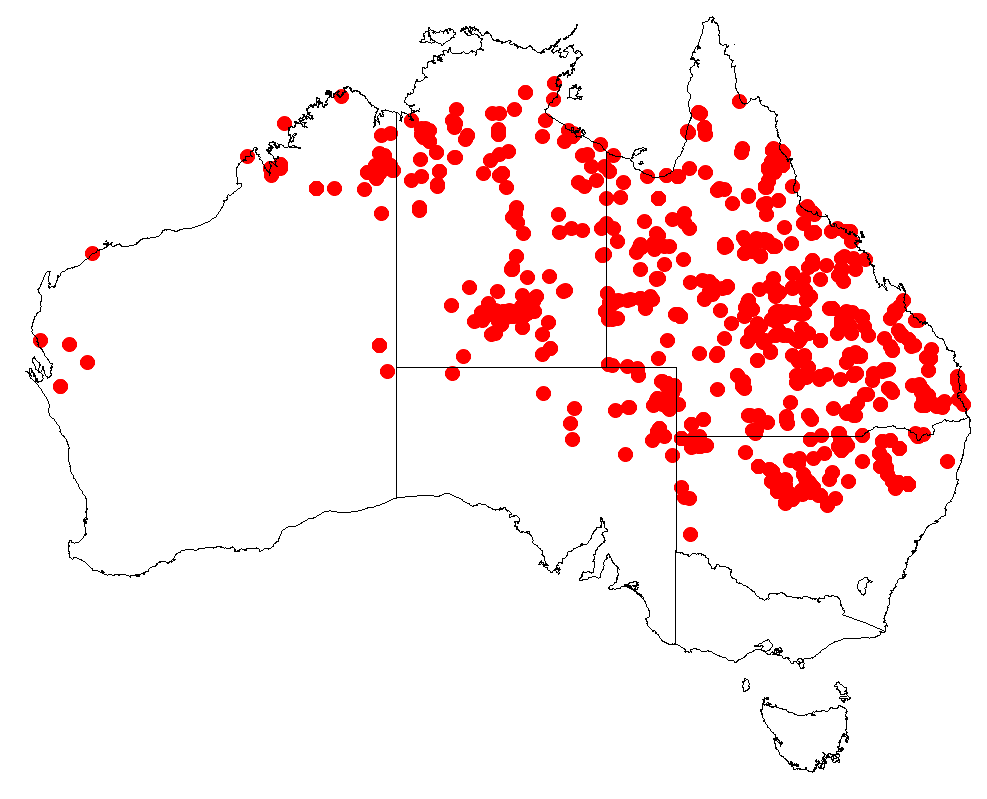
- Occurrence data from AVH

Synonyms
- Loranthus subfalcatus Hook.; Loranthus exocarpi var. subfalcatus (Hook.) Domin; Loranthus exocarpi var. venulosus Blakely

= Lysiana subfalcata =

Species of plant

Lysiana subfalcata, common name Northern mistletoe, is a spreading to pendulous hemi-parasitic shrub in the Loranthaceae (a mistletoe family) which occurs in all mainland states of Australia except Victoria.

== Description ==
Lysiana subfalcata is a smooth mistletoe with no hairs on its branches, leaves or flowers. The leaves are oblanceolate, mostly grey-green, 20–120 mm long and 4–20 mm wide, and do not always have a midvein. The paired flowers have an unlobed or weakly lobed calyx and a corolla which is 25–50 mm long. The mature corolla is red, rarely yellow, and sometimes green or black tipped. The fruits are indehiscent, succulent, yellowish and 8–14 mm long, usually pale and somewhat translucent.

Lysiana subfalcata is distinguished from other local (Northern Territory) species of Lysiana by the combination of its oblanceolate leaves, its non-winged pedicels, the paired flowers on a common peduncle, its non-septate anthers, the largely red corolla tube with green or yellow lobes, and the yellowish fruit that are longer than wide.

Lysiana subfalcata can be confused with Lysiana spathulata, but L. spathulata has broader leaves, septate anthers, and a slightly different host and habitat range.

=== Flowering and fruiting ===
The South Australian flora website describes it as flowering and fruiting throughout the year, but in the Northern Territory, the Northern Territory flora website states that it flowers from March to October and fruits from April to October.

== Ecology ==
It is found in open forests and woodland. However, the Northern Territory flora website describes it as occurring on rocky or gravelly ranges, on hills or rises, on sandplains, and on intermittent watercourses and run-on areas.

Major hosts for Lysiana subfalcata in Western Australia are species in the genera Lysiphyllum, Eucalyptus, and Acacia, while in South Australia, and New South Wales (and for Australia) they are listed as species in the genera Atalaya, Heterodendrum, Bauhinia, Santalum and the family Casuarinaceae. Hosts in the Northern Territory are listed as including species of Acacia, Alectryon, Atalaya, Capparis, Eucalyptus, Grevillea, Pittosporum, Senna and Vachellia.

== Ethnobotany ==
Aboriginal groups use Lysiana subfalcata in various ways:

- The Alyawarr for food and as a source of water.
- The Anmatyerr for firewood, and to make toys and weapons.
- The Kaytetye use the fruit for food.
- The Pintupi Luritja use the fruit for food.
- The Pitjantjatjara use the fruit as food, to make gums, as plant food for animals; the plant for shelter and shade, to make toys and weapons, fish poisons and traps.
- The Waramangu for weapons and tools, fish-poisons and traps.
- The Warlpiri as food, as plant foods for animals; the plant for shade and shelter, to make weapons and tools, fish-poisons and traps.
- The Western Arrernte people for shade and shelter.

== Gallery ==
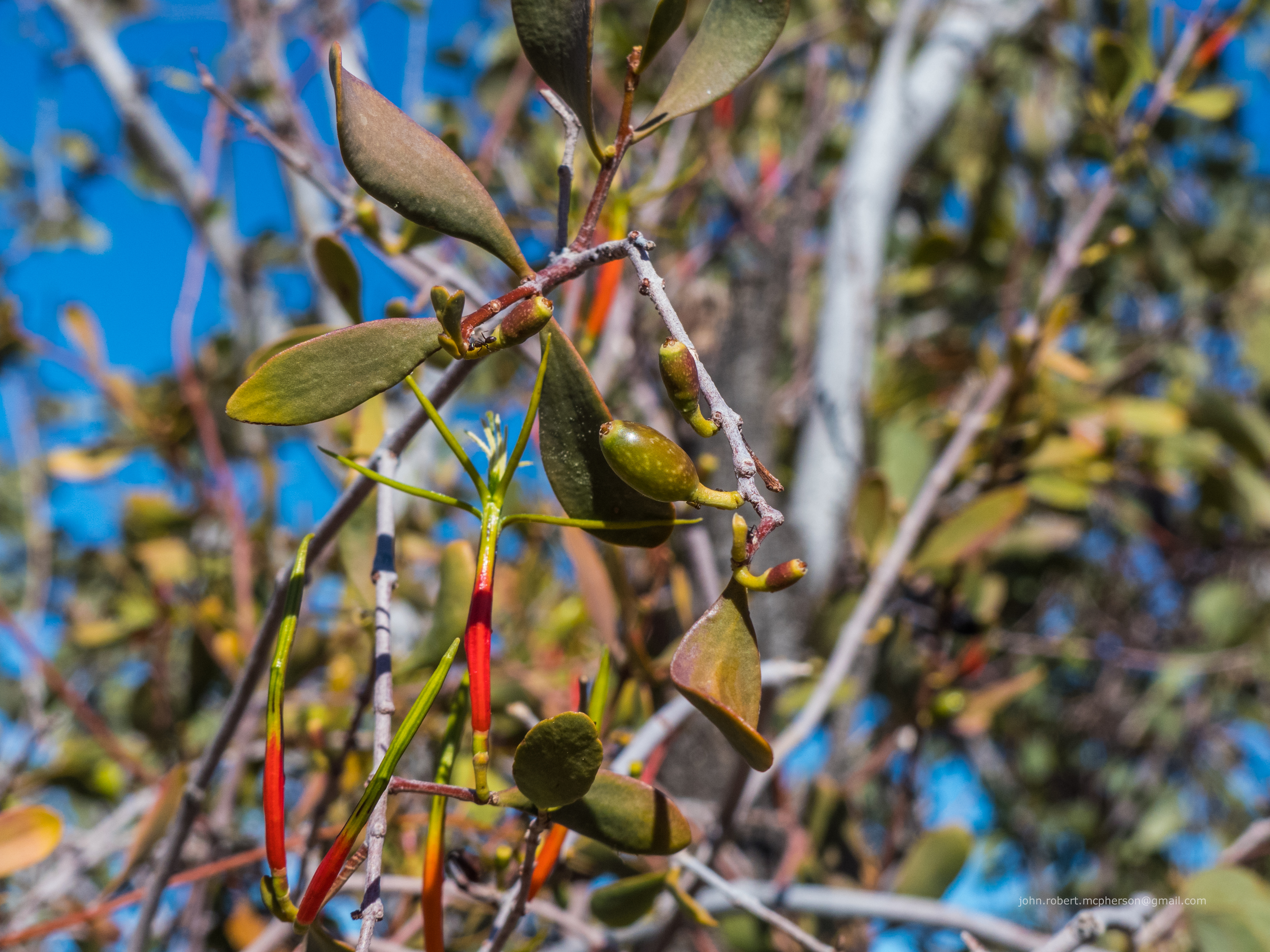
Red corolla on Lysiphyllum gilvum, Burke River floodplain, QLD

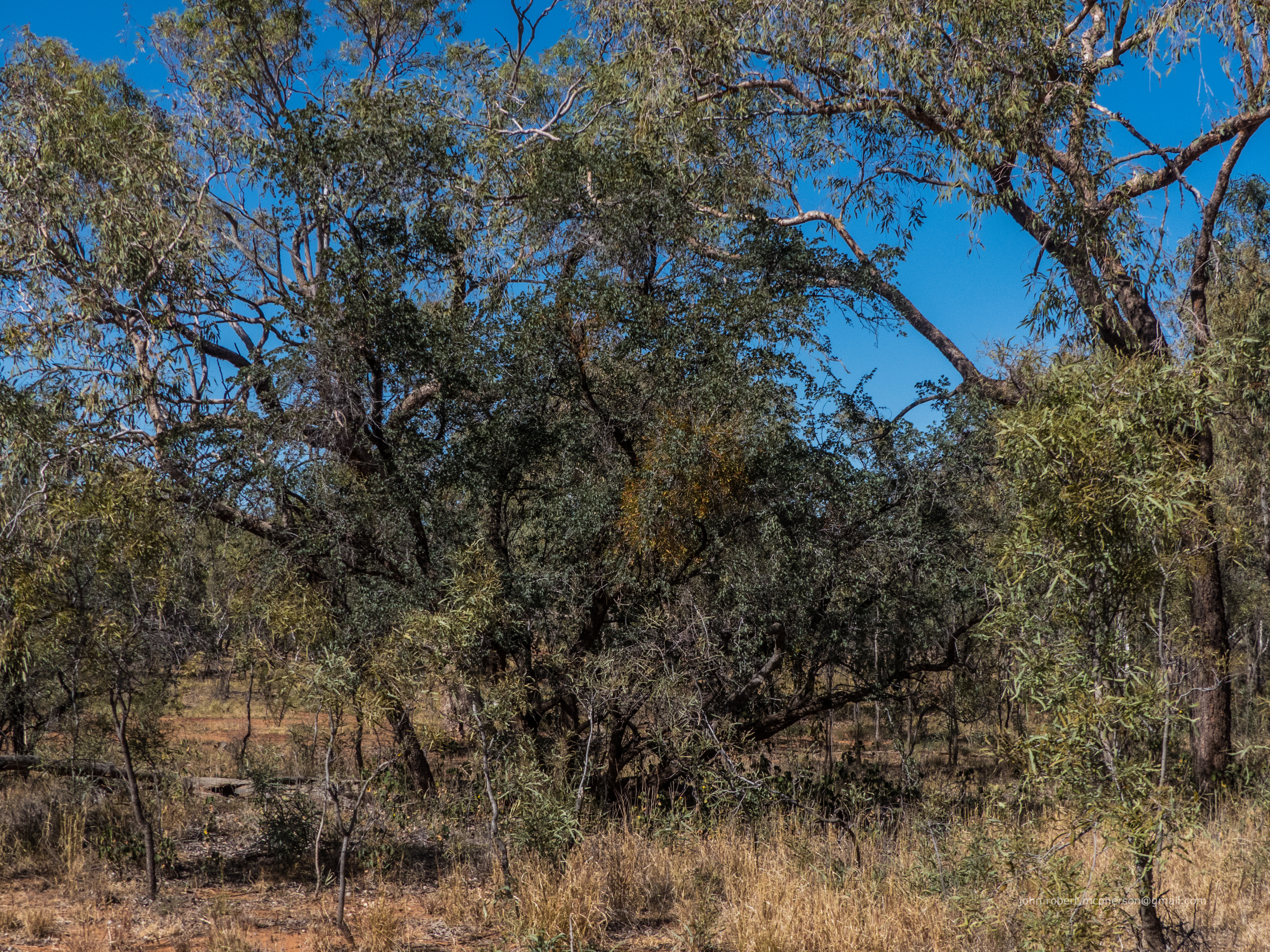
on Lysiphyllum gilvum, Burke River floodplain, QLD

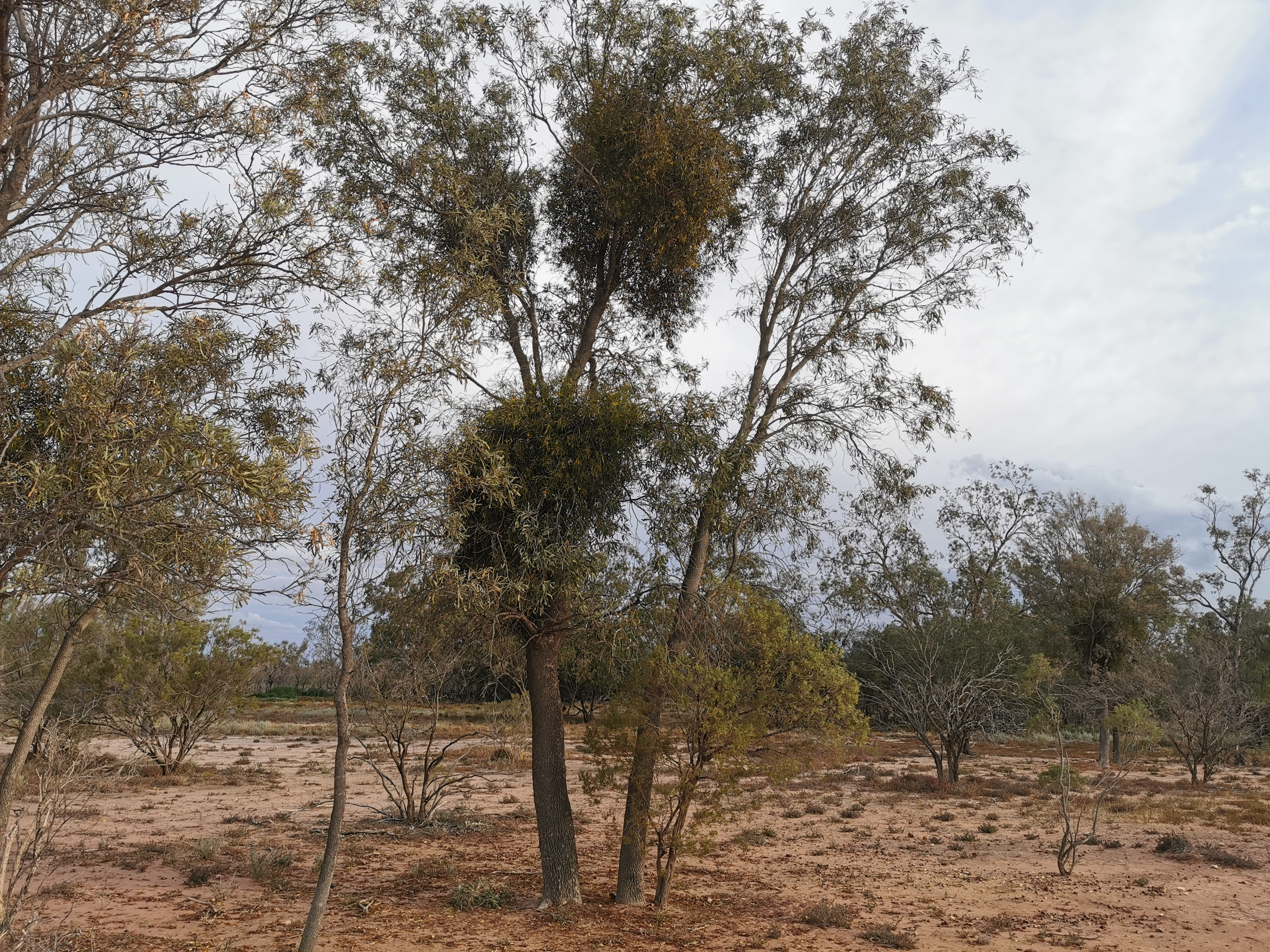
on Atalaya hemiglauca, Narran River floodplain, NSW

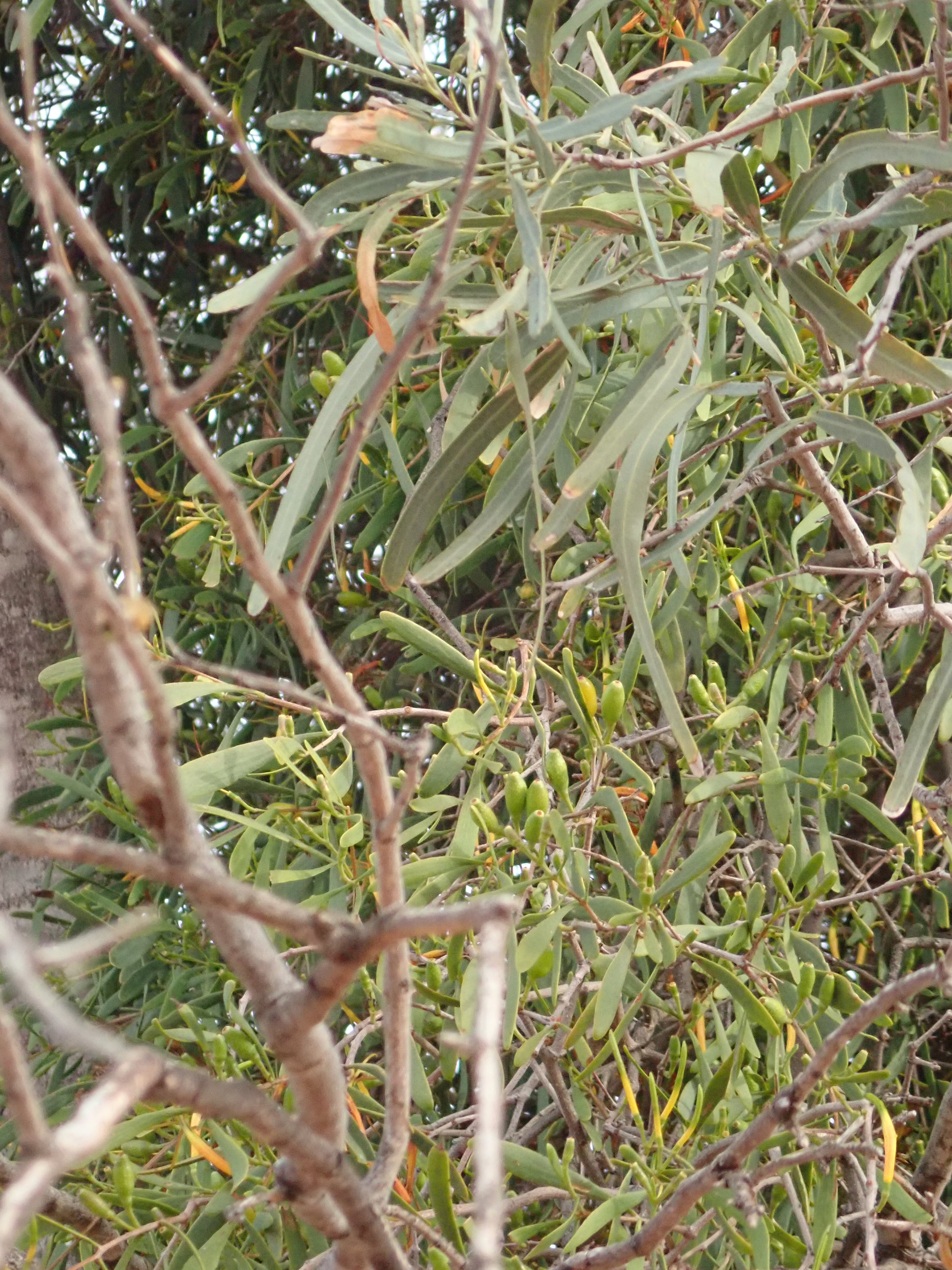
on Atalaya hemiglauca
