= Listeria innocua =

Scientific classification
- Domain: Bacteria
- Kingdom: Bacillati
- Phylum: Bacillota
- Class: Bacilli
- Order: Bacillales
- Family: Listeriaceae
- Genus: Listeria
- Species: L. innocua

Binomial name
- Listeria innocua (ex Seeliger and Schoofs 1979) Seeliger 1983

Species of bacterium

Listeria innocua is a species of Gram-positive, rod-shaped bacteria. It is motile, facultatively anaerobic, and non-spore-forming. L. innocua was named innocua (innocuous) because, in contrast to Listeria monocytogenes, it does not readily cause disease in mammals. Another Listeria species, L. seeligeri, was named after one of the discoverers of L. innocua.

Biochemically, L. innocua is very similar to L. monocytogenes, except that L. innocua is usually non-hemolytic, arylamidase-positive, and phosphoinositide phospholipase C-negative. Although it is not generally considered a human pathogen, L. innocua was identified in 2003 as the cause of death of a 62-year-old, otherwise healthy, woman.

As with other species in the genus, L. innocua occurs commonly in the environment (such as soil) and in food. Strains of L. innocua have been shown to be able to form biofilms. L. innocua has been tested and used as a laboratory surrogate for pathogenic L. monocytogenes in studies involving thermal, irradiation, and high-pressure processing of food.

Knowledge of the structure of L. innocua was refined during the 2000s to help distinguish it from L. monocytogenes. L. innocua may inhibit detection of L. monocytogenes if both species are present. One study found that L. monocytogenes was detected in 5.4% of inoculated beef broth samples when L. innocua was also present.
