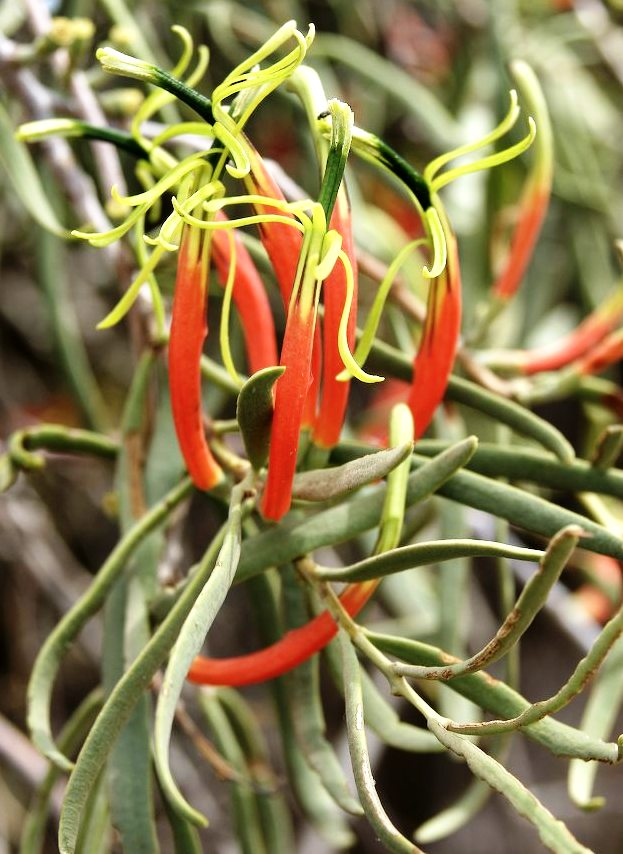

Scientific classification
- Kingdom: Plantae
- Clade: Tracheophytes
- Clade: Angiosperms
- Clade: Eudicots
- Order: Santalales
- Family: Loranthaceae
- Genus: Lysiana
- Species: L. exocarpi

Binomial name
- Lysiana exocarpi (Behr) Tiegh.

Subspecies
- L. exocarpi subsp. exocarpi L. exocarpi subsp. tenuis
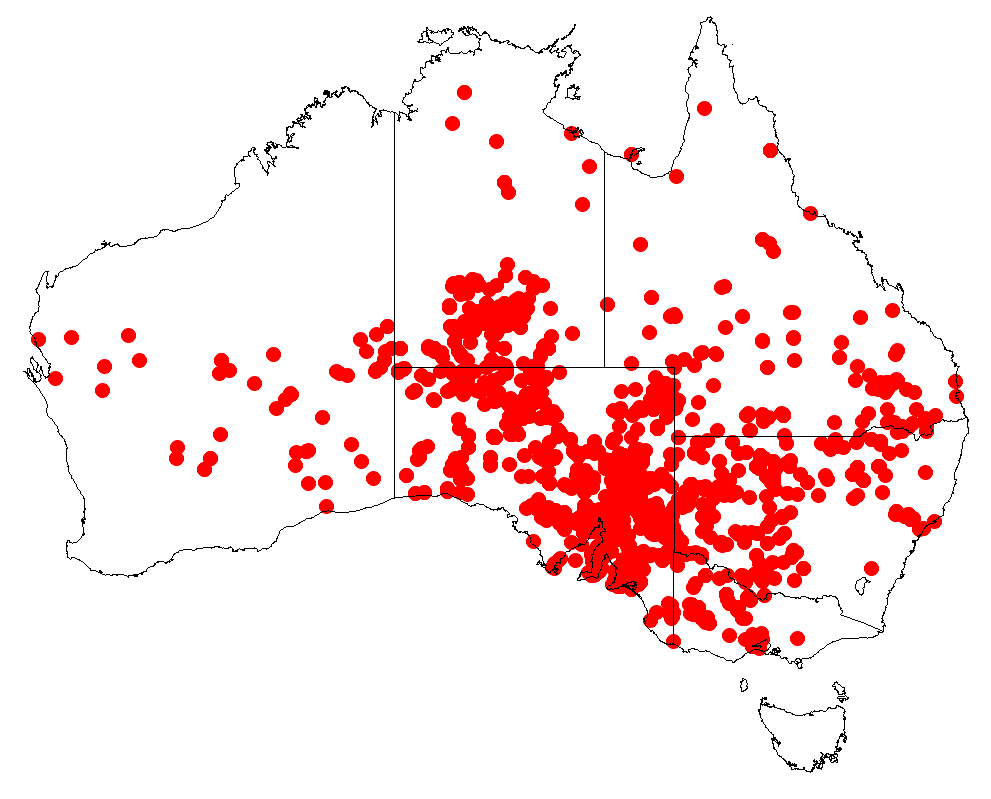
- Occurrence data from AVH

Synonyms
- Elytranthe exocarpi Behr; Loranthus angustifolius R.Br.; Loranthus exocarpi Behr

= Lysiana exocarpi =

Species of mistletoe

Lysiana exocarpi, commonly known as harlequin mistletoe, is a species of hemiparasitic shrub, endemic to Australia. It is in the Gondwanan family Loranthaceae and is probably the most derived genus of that family with 12 pairs of chromosomes. The Loranthaceae is the most diverse family in the mistletoe group with over 900 species worldwide and including the best known species in Australia. Mistletoes are notable for their relationships with other species. In an early reference to the group in Australia Allan Cunningham explorer and first Director of the Royal Botanic Gardens, Sydney, wrote in 1817: "The Bastard Box is frequently much encumbered with the twining adhering Loranthus aurantiacus (box mistletoe) which 'Scorning the soil, aloft she springs, Shakes her red plumes and claps her golden wings'."

== Description ==
Spreading to shrub, glabrous; no external runners. Leaves flat or compressed when very narrow, linear to narrow-oblong, sessile or the wider leaves shortly petiolate, 3–15 cm long, 1–10 mm wide, apex is usually rounded, base attenuate - contracted, venation is obscure; shortly petiolate. Inflorescence pedunculate usually a 2-flowered umbel; peduncle usually 0.5–2 mm in length; pedicels 2–5 mm long; bracts 1–1.5 mm long. Corolla 25–50 mm long, is usually red, rarely yellow, can also be tipped with green or black. Fruit ellipsoidal to ovoid, 6–10 mm long, red or black.

=== Subspecies ===
==== Lysiana exocarpi subsp. exocarpi ====
Leaves are linear to narrow-oblong or narrow-elliptic and occasionally obcordate, 3–10 mm wide, often thick or leathery at maturity. Plant spreading to pendent. Mostly parasitic on species of Acacia, Alectryon, Amyema, Cassia, Casuarinaceae, Eremophila, Exocarpos, and exotic trees, west from Moree district. Synonym: L. exocarpi subsp. diamantinensis

==== Lysiana exocarpi subsp. tenuis ====
Leaves linear, 1–3 mm wide, not terete but sometimes compresses. Plant is pendent. It is found in open woodland and forest, usually on species of Casuarinaceae, north from the Hunter Valley First described in 1925 by Blakely as Loranthus exocarpi var. tenuis and revised by Barlow in 1963 to Lysiana exocarpi subsp.tenuis.

=== Habitat and distribution ===
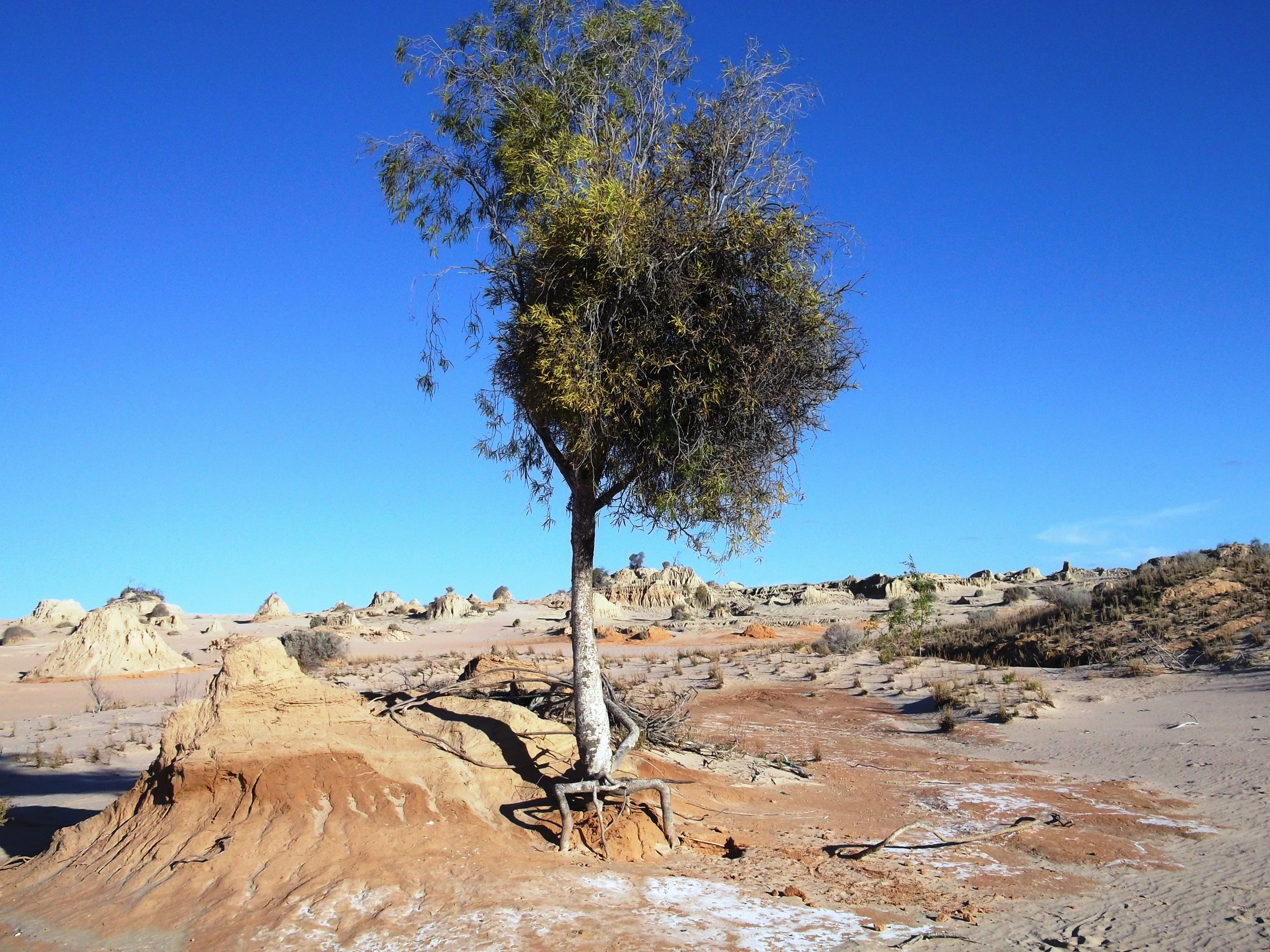
Lysiana exocarpi on Pittosporum angustifolium Mungo Walls of China

Lysiana species can be broadly grouped into those that have 80-90 units of DNA and those that have greater than 100 units. L. exocarpi is the only species that extends its range into temperate non-arid regions, with DNA values predominantly above 100, the average being 117 units.

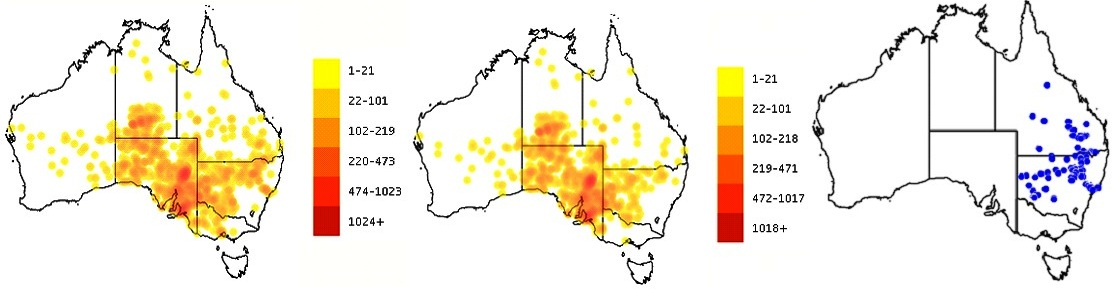
L-R Occurrences of L. exocarpi; L. exocarpi subsp. exocarpi; L. exocarpi subsp. tenuis

Open woodland and forest, extending into semi-arid woodlands dominated by acacia.

L. exocarpi: Occurs in arid and temperate regions of all mainland States, from Lake Carnegie, W.A, to the Hunter Valley, NSW, in open forest and woodland on many different hosts but frequently on other Loranthaceae.

L. exocarpi subsp. exocarpi: Occurs in arid and temperate Australia from Lake Carnegie, Q.A., to western Qld and central Vic; on many host species, most frequently on Acacia, Amyema, Cassia, Casuarinaceae, Eremophila, Exocarpos, Alectryon and exotic trees. A polymorphic subspecies, with a cline towards wider and thicker leaves from temperate to arid habitats.

L. exocarpi subsp. tenuis: Occurs in Qld and NSW from the Darling Downs to the Hunter Valley and inland to the Western Plains, in open woodland and forest, usually on Casuarinaceae.

== Life cycle ==
Lysiana exocarpi fruit

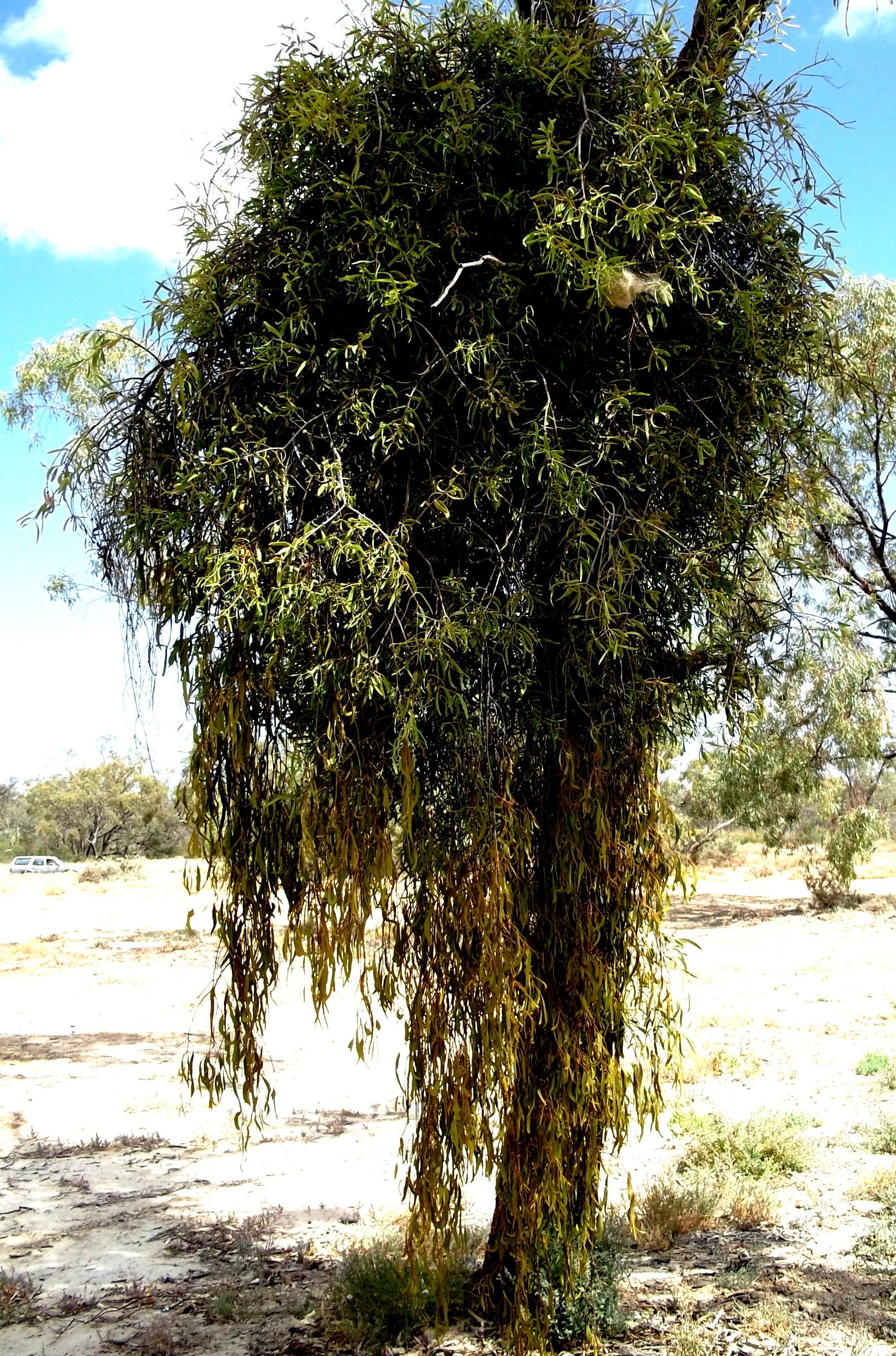
Lysiana exocarpi on Amyema miquelii (box mistletoe), Kinchega National Park

Lysiana exocarpi germinating seed dispersed by mistletoe bird

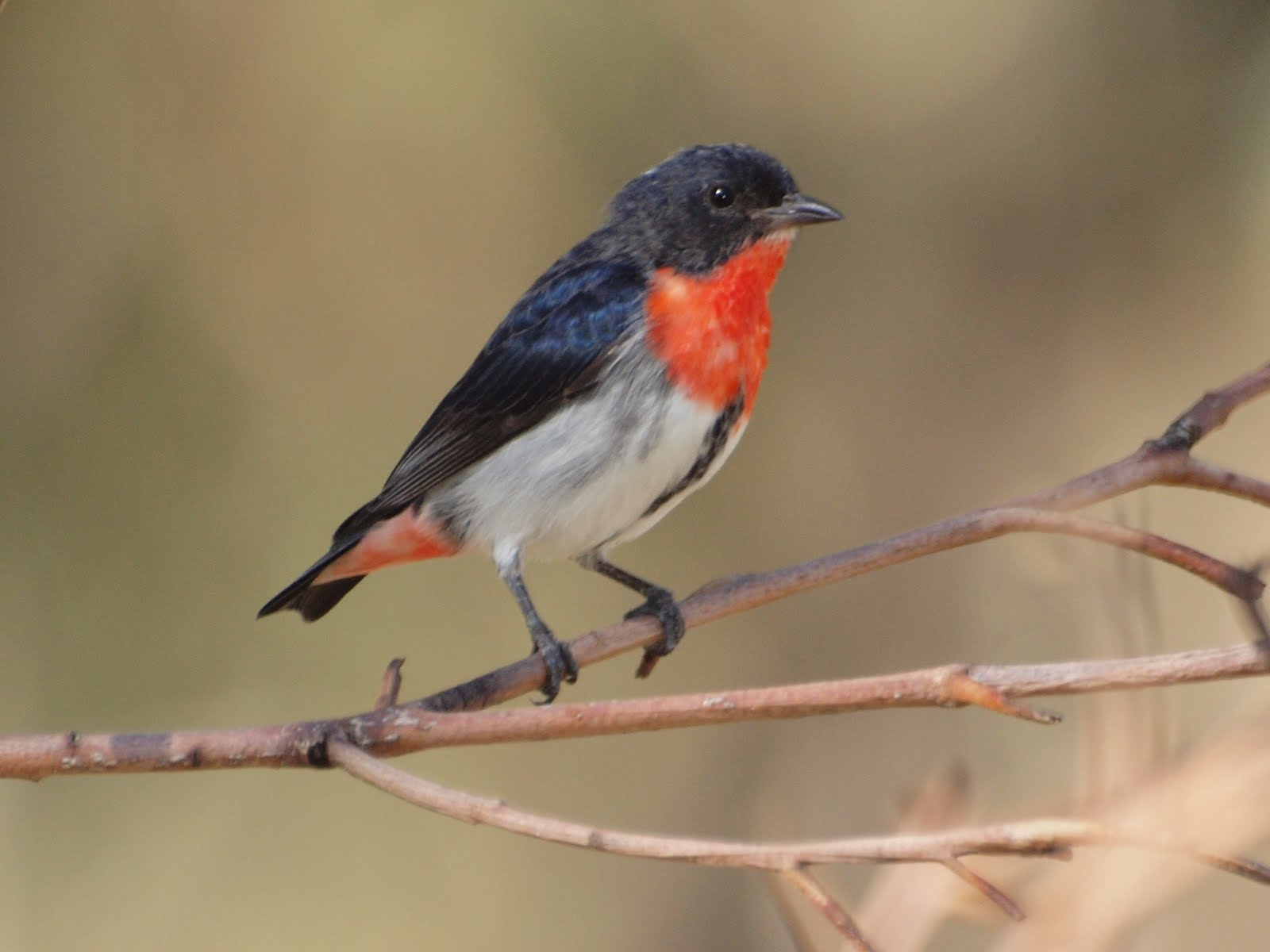
Mistletoe bird

=== Flowering and germination ===
Flowering occurs mainly in summer. Charles Brittlebank (1908) noted that germination "usually takes place in one to two days, but may be delayed in some cases for a period of 50 days".

=== Fire responses ===
Life span - 4 to 20 years. First seeds - 2 to 3 years. Adult fire response - greater than a 70% mortality when subject to total leaf scorch. Resprouting - none.

=== Parasitism ===
Lysiana exocarpi is known to epiparasitise other mistletoes, namely Amyema species: A. maidenii, A. miquelii (box mistletoe), A. quandang

=== Host plants ===
In New South Wales the most common hosts are species of Eucalyptus and Acacia and also Flindersia, Pittosporum, Santalum

In a comprehensive study of Australian herbarium specimens, Paul Downey found that the host plants for Australian mistletoes were mostly dicotyledonous angiosperms with a small number of gymnosperms in the genera Araucaria, Callitris and Pinus. No host species were herbaceous. Every host family and genus recorded contained species which were not documented as mistletoe host species. The two major genera of host species were Eucalyptus and Acacia with 2084, and 2559 records respectively. There were 187 species of Eucalyptus and 150 species of Acacia. Seven mistletoe species commonly parasitised exotic host species including L. exocarpi. The commonly recorded exotic host species included Nerium oleander, Citrus spp., Prunus spp., Schinus molle and Quercus spp. L. exocarpi was found in 901 records and 109 species. The host families were Apocynaceae, Caesalpiniaceae, Capparaceae, Casuarinaceae, Chenopodiaceae, Fabaceae, Fagaceae, Loranthaceae, Malvaceae, Meliaceae, Mimosaceae, Moraceae, Myoporaceae, Myrtaceae, Oleaceae, Pittosporaceae, Polygonaceae, Proteaceae, Rhamnaceae, Rutaceae, Santalaceae, Sapindaceae, Solanaceae and Zygophyllaceae. In a 1990 study of L. exocarpi subsp. exocarpi in Southern South Australia, Yan found that this species showed a specific preference for Alectryon oleifolius and Myoporum platycarpum supporting Barlow's view that all Australian mistletoes of open forest and woodland are host specific to some extent. He also found that rainfall was a determining factor in regulating the distribution.

=== Insect and animal associations ===
L. exocarpi is a host plant for Ogyris aenone and is a popular food plant for nectar feeding birds when in full flower.

The mistletoe fruit is a single-seeded berry, often brightly coloured, with striking adaptations for bird dispersal, germination and attachment. Under the outer coat of the fruit is a sticky layer of viscin, which is rich in glucose, and which envelops the seed. Birds which feed on the fruits often have specialized feeding behaviour, swallowing the seed whole after squeezing it from the fruit coat. Birds have been reported nipping the end off the fruit, as though removing a cap, prior to squeezing out the seed. Notable dispersal agents are the mistletoebird (Dicaeum hirundinaceum), and some honeyeaters in Australia (Grantiella, Acanthagenys, Plectorhyncha)

== Ethnobotany ==
=== Bushfood ===
According to Les Hiddins, Aboriginal people would eat the fruit without chewing so they wouldn't stick to the tongue. The ripeness of the berry is indicated not only by its softness, but often also by a slight translucence. When quite ripe the sticky, gelatinous, sweet pulp surrounding the single seed is pleasant to eat, but its great stickiness often make the seed almost impossible to spit out. Birds have the same difficulty and may sometimes be seen wiping their beaks free of seeds against the branch of a tree. Jennifer Isaacs lists berries of L. exocarpi and L.spathulata as being eaten in the Central desert Peter Latz notes that the calories obtained would be rather low. Aborigines often pluck whole branches from the tree and pick off the berries at their leisure. These berries are particularly favored by children. Although all Aboriginal groups have two or more names for mistletoes, it appears that they do not give separate names to each species. The Walpiri word for both L. murrayi and L. spathulata is pawurlirri. The Antakirinja people around Coober Pedy call the berries of L. exocarpi Ngantja. Reference to the fruit was first contained in a letter written by Governor Gawler during an ill-fated expedition in 1839 led by Charles Sturt. Gawler to his brother-in-law, Henry Cox, 20 December 1839: "The poor boy (Henry Bryan) accompanied me most cheerfully, he had been resting all day and did not appear to suffer from the subsequent exertion. He brought me the pulpy but bitter fruit of the mesembryantheumum and the little berries of the exocarpi - and ate plenty of them himself - he made many observations about our course, appearing to recollect its striking features well, and calculated our distances with much precision".

=== Medicinal ===
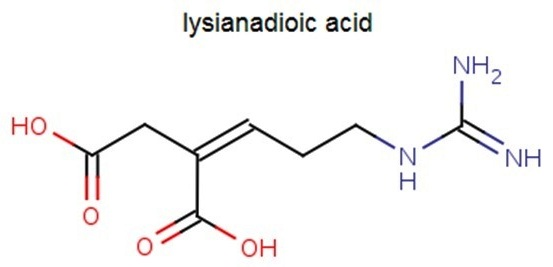
Lysianadioic acid structure

In Europe mistletoe leaves and young twigs are used by herbalists, especially in Germany, for treating circulatory and respiratory system problems. Mistletoe extract is sold as Iscador, Helixor, and several other trade names. Use of mistletoe extract in the treatment of cancer originated with Rudolf Steiner, the founder of Anthroposophy. He compared the parasitic nature of the mistletoe plant to that of cancer, and believed that cancer represents a faltering of the body's spiritual defenses. Public interest in the United States was spurred in 2001 following actress Suzanne Somers' decision to use Iscador in lieu of chemotherapy following her treatment for breast cancer. Available clinical evidence, however, does not support claims of anti-cancer effect, quality of life, or other outcomes from the use of mistletoe extract. In 2007 researchers from Griffith University in Queensland found that a new natural product, lysianadioic acid, isolated from Lysiana subfalcata(in the same genus) was a carboxypeptidase B (CPB) inhibitor. It is a potent inhibitor of CPB with an IC50 of 0.36 lM. This is the first known example of a small molecule CPB inhibitor isolated from plant origin.

== History ==
Olive Pink sketch 1930

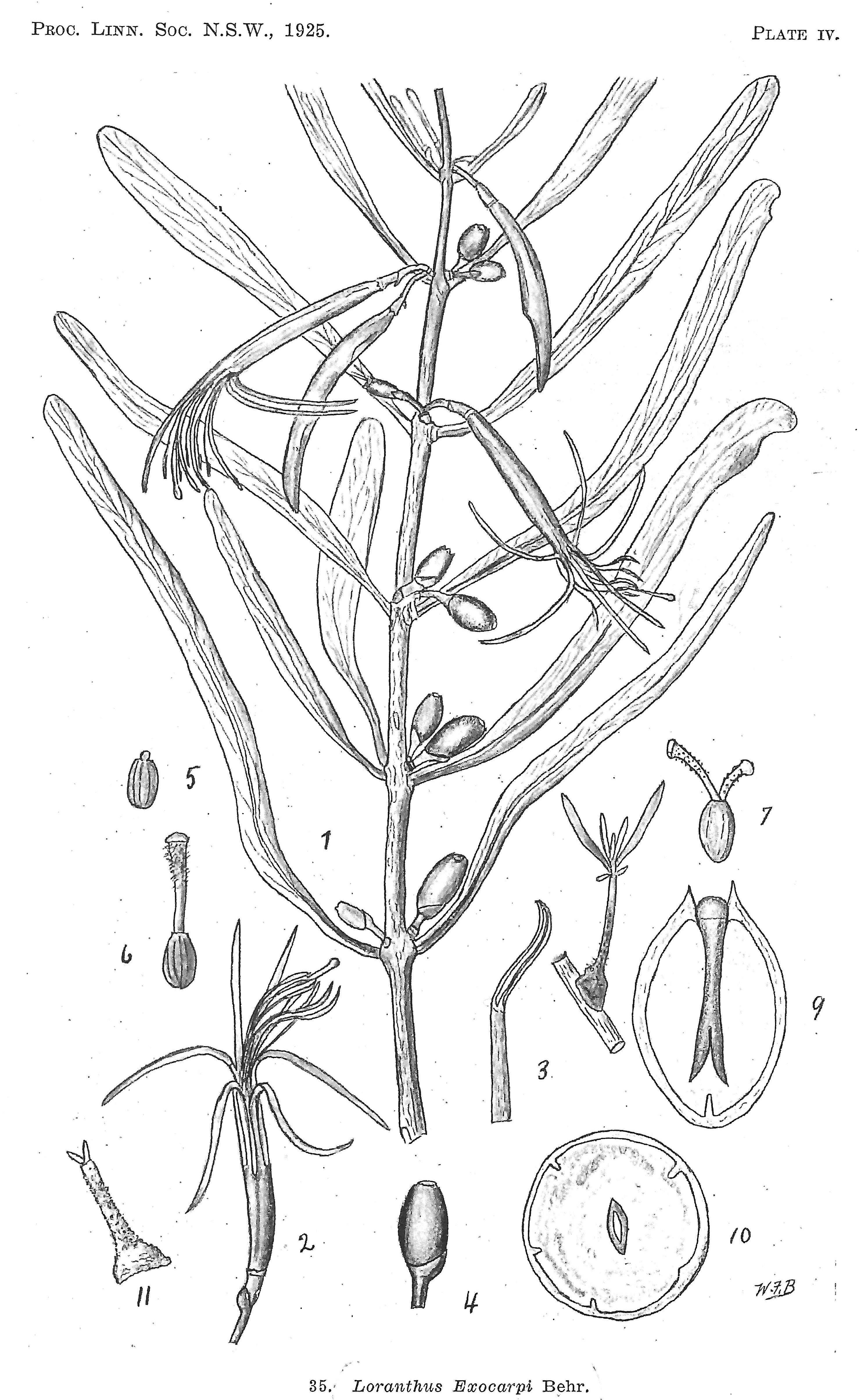
Specimen type collected by Hans Herman Behr in Barossa 1844–45, published in Proceedings of the Linnean Society, NSW, 1925

L. exocarpi was first collected from Spencer's Gulf in 1802 by Robert Brown. It was first described as Loranthus exocarpi by Hans Hermann Behr in 1847 after his first visit to Australia 1844–45. Behr was the first botanist to systematically collect and study the flora of the Barossa Range, mallee scrubs towards the River Marne and areas adjacent to the River Murray at Moorundie. Dietrich von Schlechtendahl treated 200 plants collected by Behr, of which he described 62 as being new species: a further five, including Loranthus exocarpi were described by Behr. In 1894 Philippe Édouard Léon Van Tieghem published a revision of Loranthus and created a new genus Lysiana. The name is based on the Greek lyo - "I set free" - referring to the separation of the genus from Loranthus.
