= Thallium acetate =

There are two thallium acetate salts:

- Thallous acetate, TlOAc, a microbiological selective growth medium
- Thallic acetate, Tl(OAc)_{3}, a depilatory discontinued for toxicity
