= Listeria grayi =

Scientific classification
- Domain: Bacteria
- Kingdom: Bacillati
- Phylum: Bacillota
- Class: Bacilli
- Order: Bacillales
- Family: Listeriaceae
- Genus: Listeria
- Species: L. grayi

Binomial name
- Listeria grayi Larsen et al. 1966

Species of bacterium

Listeria grayi is a species of bacteria. It is a Gram-positive, facultatively anaerobic, motile, non-spore-forming bacteria. It is non-hemolytic and its colonies are rod-shaped. The species was first proposed in 1966. It is named after M.L. Gray, an early researcher in L. monocytogenes There are two subspecies of L. grayi: L. gray subs. grayi, and L. grayi subsp. murrayi.

Listeria murrayi (named after a co-founder of L. monocytogenes) was originally a separate species of Listeria when proposed in 1971. However, there was controversy over whether L. grayi and L. murrayi were the same species, or belonged in genus Listeria altogether. In 1974, researchers suggested that a new genus be created for the two species, called, Murraya, although furthers studies by other researchers in 1987 proposed that the two species remain in Listeria. In 1996, further studies showed that L. murrayi was a subspecies of L. grayi.
