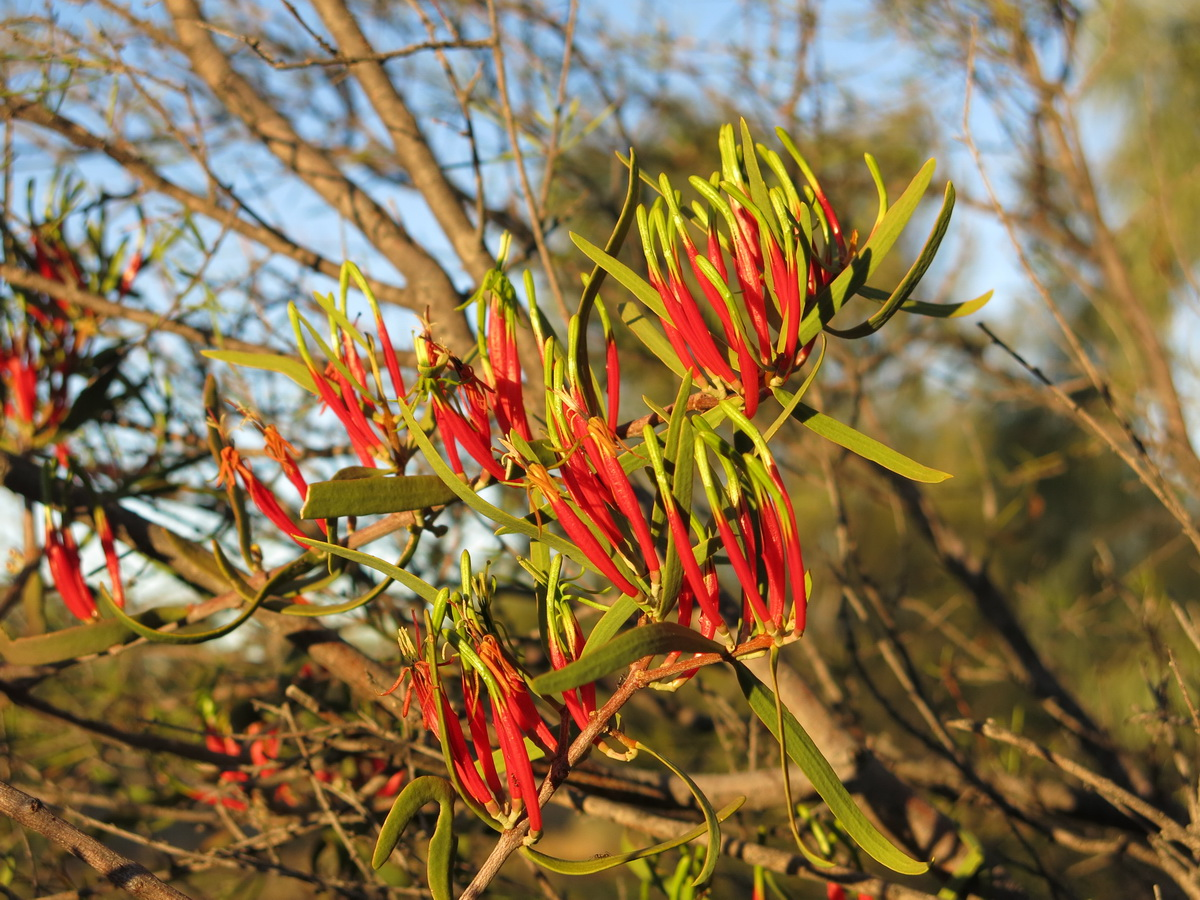
- Lysiana exocarpi

Scientific classification
- Kingdom: Plantae
- Clade: Tracheophytes
- Clade: Angiosperms
- Clade: Eudicots
- Order: Santalales
- Family: Loranthaceae
- Genus: Lysiana; Tiegh.

Species
- See text

= Lysiana =

Genus of mistletoes

Lysiana is a genus of hemiparasitic shrubs endemic to Australia, in the family Loranthaceae.

== Description ==
Lysiana is a genus of aerial shrubs, which are parasitic on the stems of their hosts. They are erect to pendulous, smooth and with no epicortical runners. The leaves are opposite, and sometimes clustered on shortened axes, and flat with pinnate venation or compressed or terete. The inflorescence is axillary, and may be either a pedunculate or sessile two-flowered umbel or a single flower. The flowers have just one bract per flower. The six Petals are united into a curved tube inflated in middle and unequally divided, more deeply so and more reflexed on concave side. The stamens are equal. The anthers are fixed at the base, and about as long as free part of filament.

== Species include ==
- Lysiana casuarinae (Miq.) Tiegh.
- Lysiana exocarpi (Behr) Tiegh. (Harlequin mistletoe)
- Lysiana filifolia Barlow
- Lysiana linearifolia Tiegh.
- Lysiana maritima (Barlow) Barlow
- Lysiana murrayi (F.Muell. & Tate) Tiegh.
- Lysiana spathulata (Blakely) Barlow
- Lysiana subfalcata (Hook.) Barlow
