= Thallous acetate =

Names
- IUPAC name Thallium(I) Acetate
- Other names Thallium monoacetate

Identifiers
CAS Number	563-68-8
3D model (JSmol)	Interactive image
ChEBI	CHEBI:75192
ChemSpider	10773
ECHA InfoCard	100.008.416
EC Number	209-257-5
PubChem CID	11247
UNII	Q2901889VM
UN number	1707 3082
CompTox Dashboard (EPA)	DTXSID6024331
- InChI: InChI=1S/3C2H4O2.Tl/c3*1-2(3)4;/h3*1H3,(H,3,4);/q;;;+3/p-3 Key: SMRRYUGQTFYZGD-UHFFFAOYSA-K
- SMILES: CC(=O)[O-].[Tl+]

Properties
Chemical formula	TlC_{2}H_{3}O_{2}
Molar mass	263.429
Solubility in water	soluble
Magnetic susceptibility (χ)	−69.0·10^{−6} cm^{3}/mol

Hazards
- GHS labelling
Pictograms	(GHS06: Toxic) (GHS08: Health hazard) (GHS09: Environmental hazard)
Signal word	Danger
Hazard statements	H300, H330, H373, H411
Precautionary statements	P260, P264, P270, P271, P273, P284, P301+P310, P304+P340, P310, P314, P320, P321, P330, P391, P403+P233, P405, P501
- Lethal dose or concentration (LD, LC)
LD_{50} (median dose)	35 mg/kg (mouse, oral); 41.3 mg/kg (rat, oral)
- NIOSH (US health exposure limits)
PEL (Permissible)	TWA 0.1 mg/m^{3} [skin]
REL (Recommended)	TWA 0.1 mg/m^{3} [skin]
IDLH (Immediate danger)	15 mg/m^{3} (as Tl)
- Except where otherwise noted, data are given for materials in their standard state (at 25 °C [77 °F], 100 kPa). Infobox references

Thallous acetate or thallium(I) acetate is one of two salts of thallium and acetate; it has chemical formula TlCH_{3}COO. It is used in microbiology as a selective growth medium. It is poisonous.

Unlike higher homologues, which undergo the Hunsdiecker reaction, thallium(I) acetate reacts with bromine to give the thallium(III) salt TlBr_{2}OAc.
