= Listeria ivanovii =

Scientific classification
- Domain: Bacteria
- Kingdom: Bacillati
- Phylum: Bacillota
- Class: Bacilli
- Order: Bacillales
- Family: Listeriaceae
- Genus: Listeria
- Species: L. ivanovii

Binomial name
- Listeria ivanovii Seeliger et al. 1984

Species of bacterium

Listeria ivanovii is a species of bacteria in the genus Listeria. The listeria are rod-shaped bacteria, do not produce spores, and become positively stained when subjected to Gram staining. Of the six bacteria species within the genus, L. ivanovii is one of the two pathogenic species (the other being L. monocytogenes). In 1955 Bulgaria, the first known isolation of this species was found from sheep. It behaves like L. monocytogenes, but is found almost exclusively in ruminants (mainly sheep). The species is named in honor of Bulgarian microbiologist Ivan Ivanov. This species is facultatively anaerobic, which makes it possible for it to go through fermentation when there is oxygen depletion.

== Table ==
Morphological, physiological, and biochemical characteristics of Listeria ivanovii are shown in the table below.

Test type	Test	Characteristics
Colony characters	Size	Small
Colony characters	Type	Round
Colony characters	Color	Bluish grey
Colony characters	Shape	Smooth
Morphological characters	Shape	Rod
Physiological characters	Motility	+
Physiological characters	Blood agar	β-hemolytic
Physiological characters	Growth at 6.5% NaCl	+
Biochemical characters	Gram staining	+
Biochemical characters	Oxidase	-
Biochemical characters	Catalase	+
Biochemical characters	Oxidative-Fermentative	Fermentative
Biochemical characters	Motility	+
Biochemical characters	Methyl Red	+
Biochemical characters	Voges-Proskauer	+
Biochemical characters	Indole	-
Biochemical characters	H_{2}S Production	-
Biochemical characters	Urease	+
Biochemical characters	Nitrate reductase	-
Biochemical characters	β-Galactosidase	+
Hydrolysis of	Gelatin	-
Hydrolysis of	Casein	-
Utilization of	Glycerol	+
Utilization of	Galactose	-
Utilization of	D-Glucose	+
Utilization of	D-Fructose	+
Utilization of	D-Mannose	-
Utilization of	Mannitol	-

Note: + = Positive, - = Negative

L. Ivanovii conony characteristics are observed on nutrient agar plates or slants.

== Distinction ==
Listeria ivanovii can be distinguished from L. monocytogenes and other Listeria species by culturing it on sheep or horse blood agar, which will produce a wide, clear or double zone of haemolysis, producing a so-called positive Christie-Atkins-Munch-Petersen (CAMP) reaction with Rhodococcus equi but not with haemolytic Staphylococcus aureus. L. ivanovii's unique feature compared to most species in this genus is that it can ferment D-ribose.

The bacteria doesn't produce CO_{2} for the Oxidase test. The Nitrate reductase test results in Nitrate not reducing to Nitrite, so it reduces to something other than this. Gelatin doesn't liquify/hydrolyzed, which would prove if the bacteria produces gelatinases. On a blood agar containing sheep or horse blood, the agar shows β-hemolytic.

== Pathology ==
Infection with L. ivanovii can lead to septicemic disease with enteritis, neonatal sepsis and even abortion. Pregnant ruminants are therefore most at risk. The infection multiplies in the liver and is known to spread to macrophages as well as non-phagocytic cells. Listeria ivanovii can be found in the soil, water, feces, and several different types of food. Animals can get infected due to eating decomposed plants and feces from other infected animals.

Although L. ivanovii is most typically found in sheep, it can be passed to humans via food such as fresh cheese. Until 2010, this bacteria was thought to only infect ruminants (sheep), and its sister bacteria Listeria monocytogenes was blamed for infection of humans. A human infection because of L. ivanovii is rare, but serious. This bacteria infection is serious because L. ivanovii can continue to grow on foods in refrigerated conditions. If a person were to contract an infection from this bacteria, they would begin to develop mild flu-like symptoms that could potentially turn into more serious conditions such as sepsis, meningitis, encephalitis, and intrauterine infections (an infection of the womb that can cause abortions). The best way to avoid this infection, especially for those at risk (elderly, weakened immune systems, and pregnant women) maintain a clean kitchen and to avoid foods such as unpasteurized milk, cheese made from unpasteurized milk, and raw fish.

Testing for the presence of this bacteria is often determined by testing fecal material.

L. ivanovii can have transformation in a research setting using electrotransformation with a plasmid that uses ActA protein. The ActA protein is used, so that the recombinant plasmid can code the N-terminus region of the protein. To perform this, a buffer must be used in order for electrotransformation to be performed with L. ivanovii.

== Human infection ==
In January 2007, a 55-year-old man was hospitalized in Paris, France. After examination he was thought to have listeriosis. Both blood and stool samples were taken. L. ivanovii was identified, thus characterizing the species as an enteric opportunistic human pathogen. As L. ivanovii is usually only found in ruminants and human infection is extremely rare, this infection can be seen as a form of zoonosis.

== Treatment ==
If diagnosed early, antibiotics can be effective. Antibiotics effective against Listeria species include ampicillin, vancomycin, ciprofloxacin and azithromycin. Early diagnosis is uncommon because infection is not usually accompanied by symptoms.
