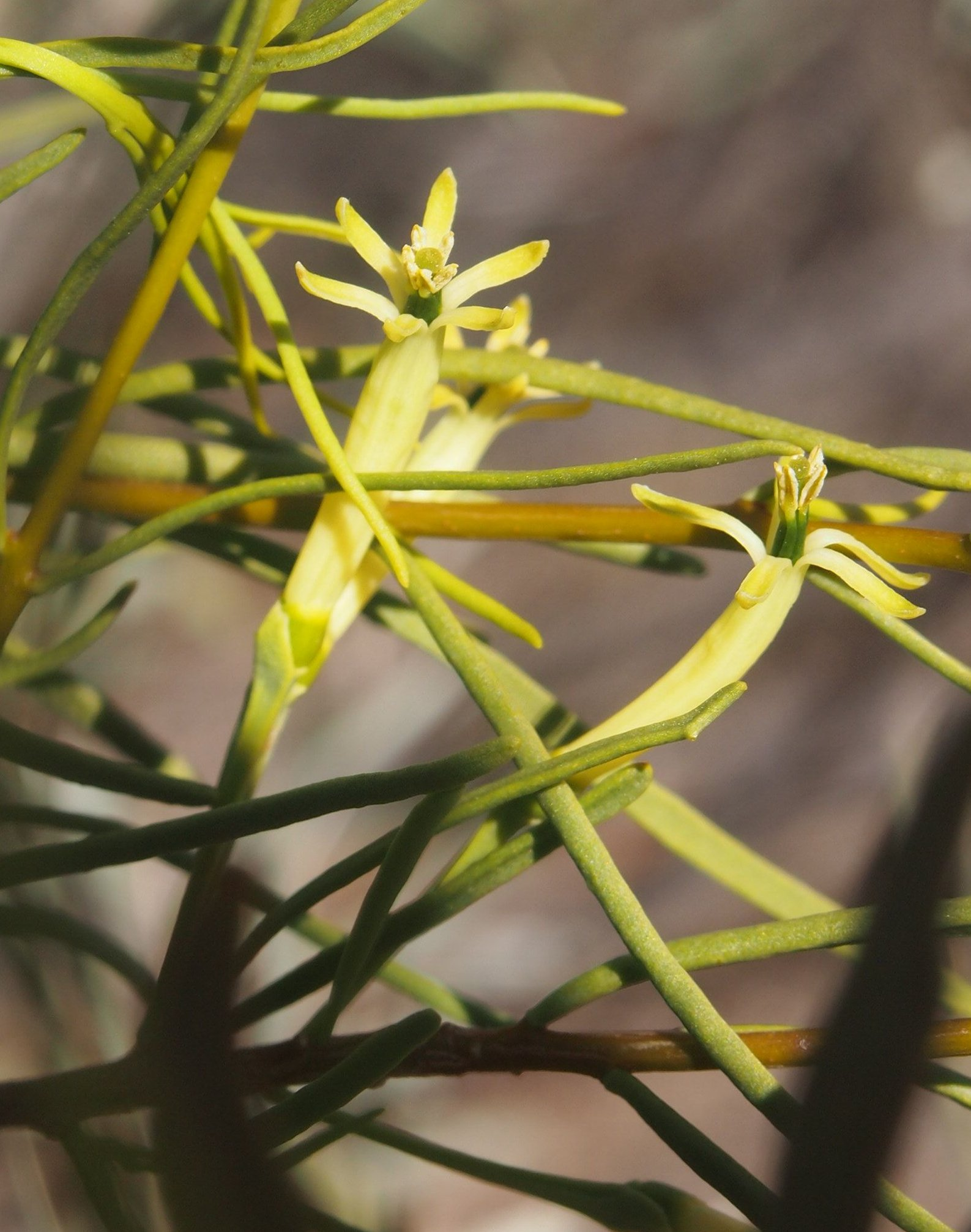

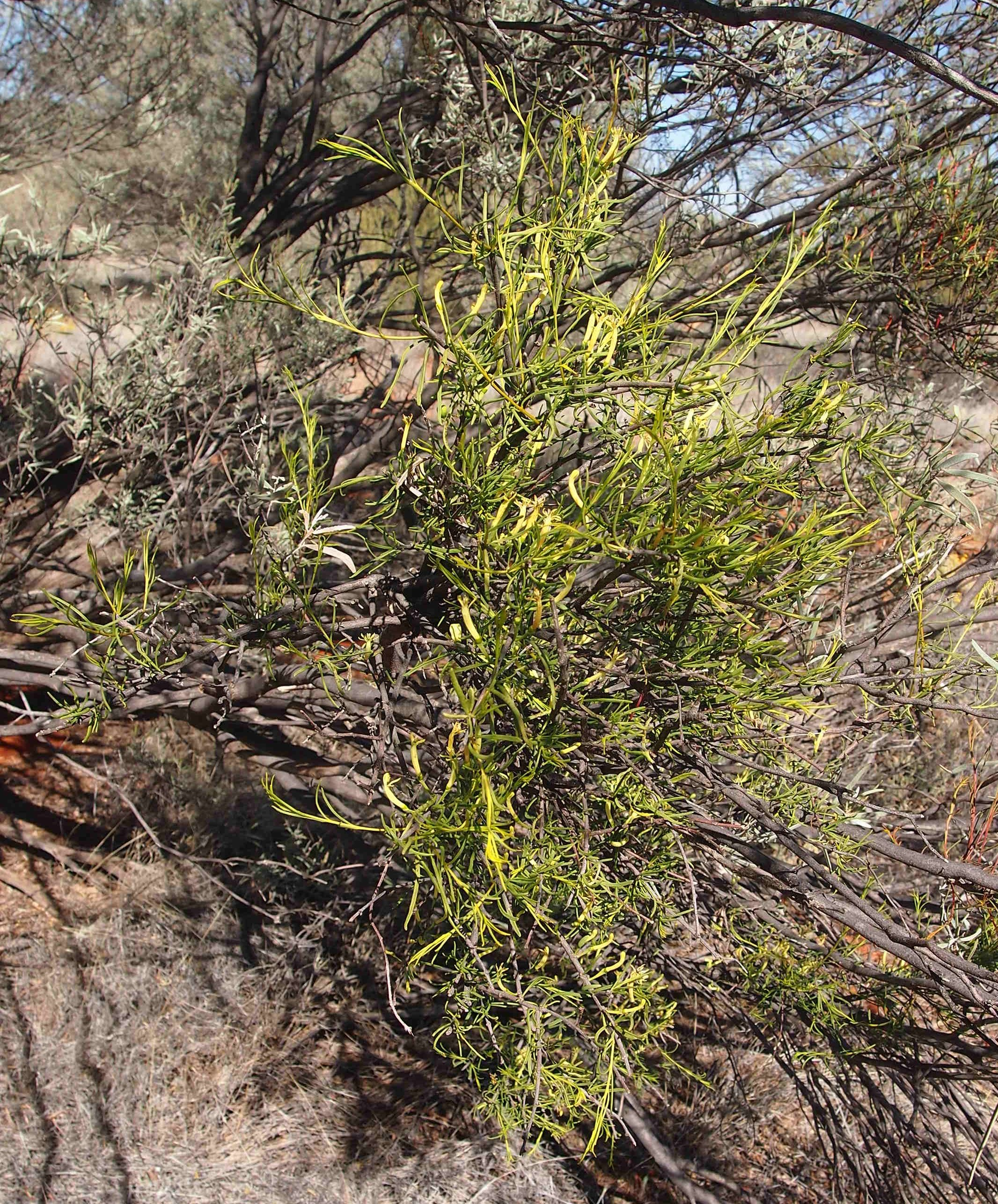

Scientific classification
- Kingdom: Plantae
- Clade: Tracheophytes
- Clade: Angiosperms
- Clade: Eudicots
- Order: Santalales
- Family: Loranthaceae
- Genus: Lysiana
- Species: L. murrayi

Binomial name
- Lysiana murrayi (F.Muell. & Tate) Tiegh.
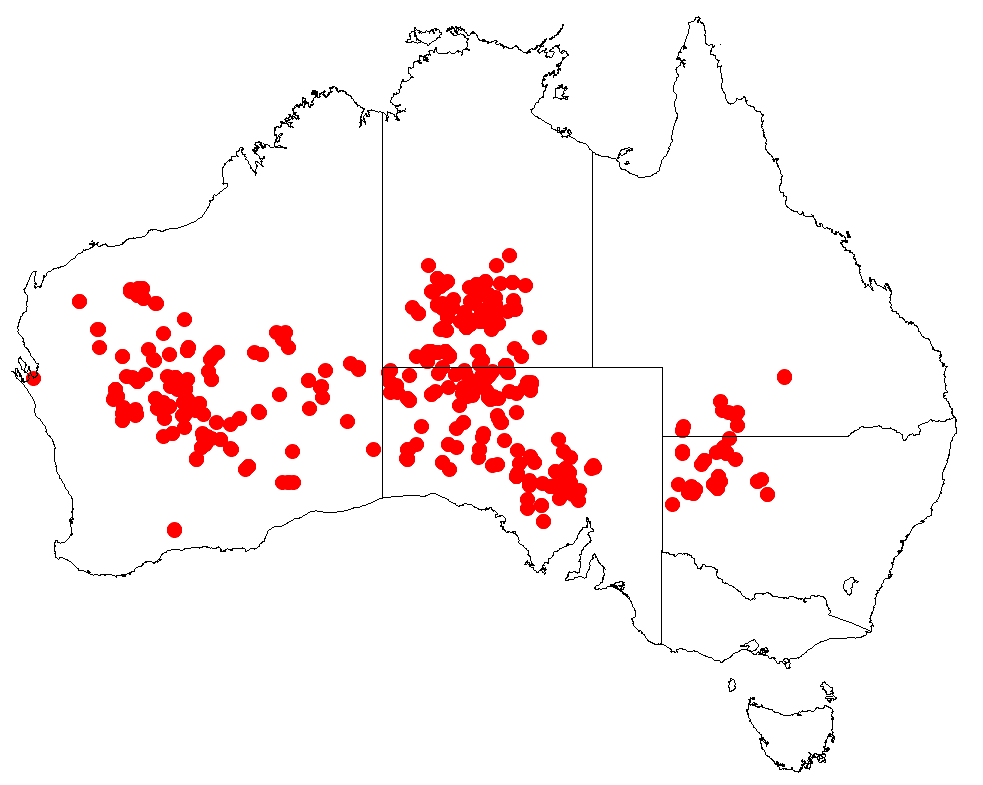
- Occurrence data from AVH

Synonyms
- Loranthus murrayi F.Muell. & Tate; Elytranthe murrayi (F.Muell. & Tate) Engl.; Loranthus murrayi F.Muell. & Tate var. murrayi; Loranthus miniatus S.Moore; Loranthus murrayi var. parviflorus S.Moore; Lysiana miniata (S.Moore) Danser

= Lysiana murrayi =

Species of mistletoe

Lysiana murrayi (or Mulga mistletoe) is an erect or spreading hemi-parasitic shrub in the Loranthaceae (a mistletoe family) which occurs in all mainland states of Australia except Victoria. It has flat narrow leaves (which may sometimes be semi-terete with a channel on the upper surface). The leaves are 2.5–6 cm long, 1–3.5 mm wide, do not have a distinct petiole, and the venation is not visible. The inflorescence is a solitary flower or pair of flowers without a common peduncle. The pedicels are 8–20 mm long, and strongly winged towards the apex. The spreading, membranous bracts are 2–3 mm long, and rounded at the apex. The corolla of the mature bud is usually 18–28 mm long, and white, yellow or pink. The fruit is globose, 7–12 mm long, and pink or red.

It occurs from the Ashburton River in Western Australia, to the Western Plains of New South Wales and Queensland, growing in arid and semi-arid woodland and nearly always on Acacias.
