= Brochothrix =

Scientific classification
- Domain: Bacteria
- Kingdom: Bacillati
- Phylum: Bacillota
- Class: Bacilli
- Order: Bacillales
- Family: Listeriaceae
- Genus: Brochothrix; Sneath and Jones 1976

Type species
- Brochothrix thermosphacta (McLean & Sulzbacher 1953) Sneath & Jones 1976

Species
- B. campestris; B. thermosphacta

Genus of bacteria

Brochothrix is genus of Gram-positive, nonmotile, catalase-positive, facultatively anaerobic bacteria that are nonmotile and form regular rod-shaped cells. The name Brochothrix is derived from the Greek noun brochos meaning loop and the Greek noun thrix meaning thread, from exponential-phase cultures which often show rods occurring in long, kinked, filamentous-like chains which bend and loop to give characteristic knotted masses. The genus is mostly associated with spoilage of high value food, such as meat and fish, caused by off-odor development. The type species is B. thermosphacta and the only other species in the genus is B. campestris . There is no evidence that any Brochothrix strain is pathogenic to humans or animals.

== History ==
The first Brochothrix species, Brochothrix thermosphacta, was isolated from pork sausage in 1953. However, the genus was not recognized as distinct until 1976.

== Phylogeny ==
The currently accepted taxonomy is based on the List of Prokaryotic names with Standing in Nomenclature (LPSN) and National Center for Biotechnology Information (NCBI).

16S rRNA based LTP_10_2024

- Brochothrix
  - B. campestris Talon et al. 1988
  - B. thermosphacta (McLean & Sulzbacher 1953) Sneath & Jones 1976

120 marker proteins based GTDB 09-RS220

- Brochothrix
  - B. campestris
  - B. thermosphacta
