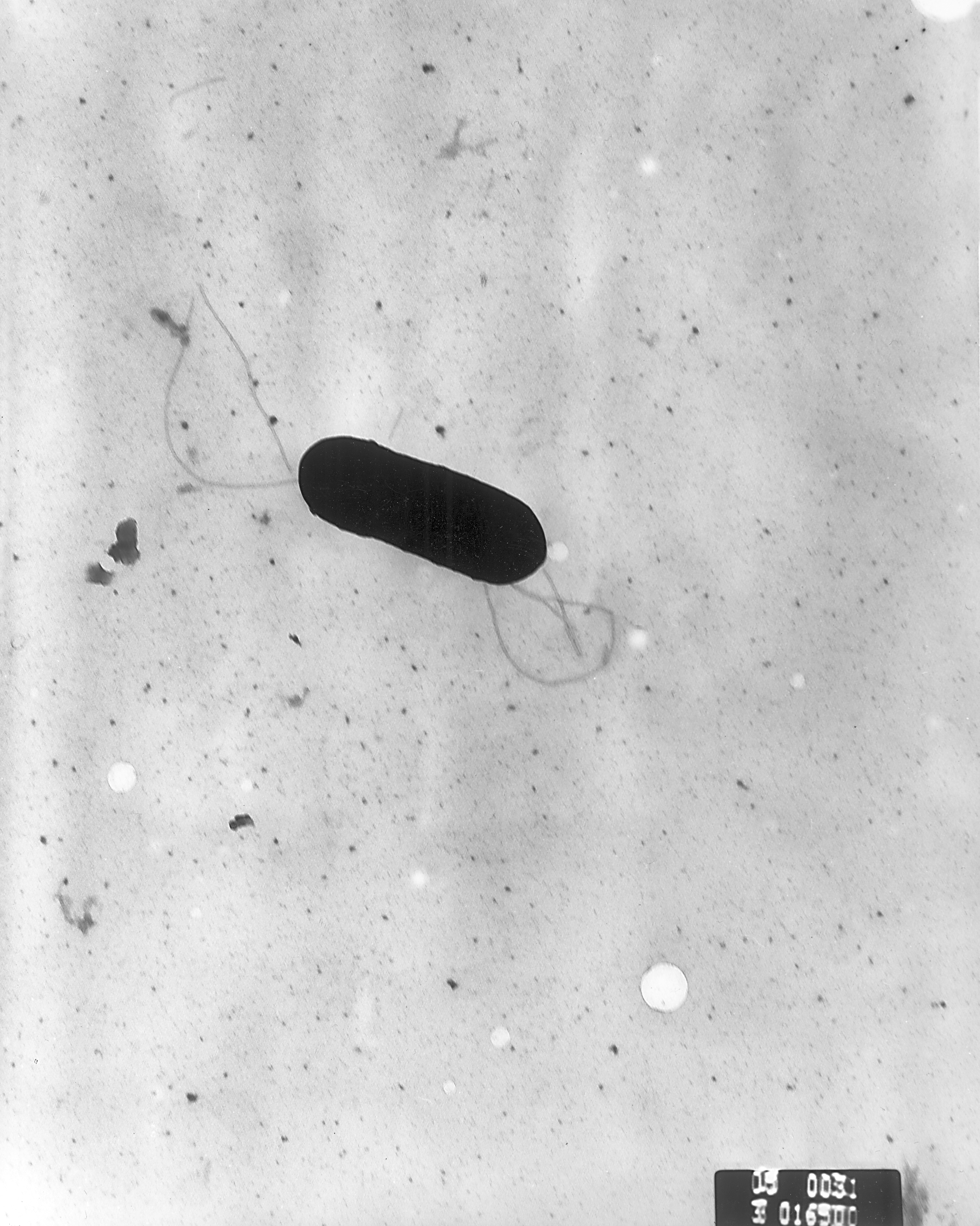
- Listeria monocytogenes

Scientific classification
- Domain: Bacteria
- Kingdom: Bacillati
- Phylum: Bacillota
- Class: Bacilli
- Order: Bacillales
- Family: Listeriaceae; Garrity et al. 2001

Genera
- Brochothrix; Listeria; "Paenilisteria"

Synonyms
- "Brochotrichaceae" corrig. Bouznada et al. 2024

= Listeriaceae =

Family of bacteria

The Listeriaceae are a family of Gram-positive bacteria that includes two genera: Listeria and Brochothrix. They are short, rod-shaped bacteria that are aerobic or facultatively anaerobic. Spores are not formed, but under stress these bacteria can form filaments. Some species, namely Listeria monocytogenes, can cause human and animal listeriosis. While not all bacteria in the Listeriaceae family are considered a danger to humans, some are strongly associated with food borne illness or microbial spoilage, so they remain a topic of interest in agricultural industries.

== Phylogeny ==
The currently accepted taxonomy is based on the List of Prokaryotic names with Standing in Nomenclature (LPSN) and National Center for Biotechnology Information (NCBI).

16S rRNA based LTP_10_2024

- Listeriaceae
  - - "Murraya" Stuart & Welshimer 1974 ex Bouznada et al. 2024
    - "Mesolisteria" Orsi & Wiedmann 2016
  - - Brochothrix Sneath & Jones 1976
    - - "Paenilisteria" Orsi & Wiedmann 2016
      - Listeria Pirie 1940

120 marker proteins based GTDB 09-RS220

- Listeriaceae
  - Brochothrix
  - - "Paenilisteria"
    - - Listeria
        - ("Mesolisteria")
        - - ("Murraya")
          - (Listeria)

== See also ==
- List of Bacteria genera
- List of bacterial orders
