= Pascale Cossart =

French bacteriologist (born 1948)

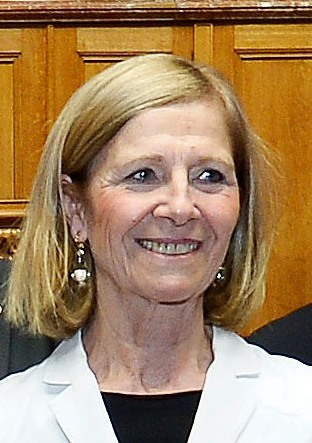
- Cossart in 2013
- Born: Pascale Françoise Xavier Gheerbrant; 21 March 1948 (age 78); Cambrai, France
- Education: Lille University, Georgetown University, University of Paris
- Awards: Carlos J. Finlay Prize for Microbiology (1995); Robert Koch Prize (2007); Louis-Jeantet Prize for Medicine (2008); Balzan Prize (2013); Ernst Jung Gold Medal for Medicine (2017)
- Scientific career
- Fields: Bacteriology
- Workplaces: Pasteur Institute

Pascale Françoise Xavier Cossart (French pronunciation: [paskal kɔsaʁ]; née Gheerbrant; born 21 March 1948) is a French bacteriologist who is affiliated with the Pasteur Institute of Paris. She is the foremost authority on Listeria monocytogenes, a deadly and common food-borne pathogen responsible for encephalitis, meningitis, bacteremia, gastroenteritis, and other diseases.

== Biography ==
Cossart was born in the north of France in 1948. She grew up and attended school in Arras. Cossart earned a B.S. and M.S. from Lille University in 1968. She then earned an M.S. in chemistry from Georgetown University in 1971, and her Ph.D. in biochemistry at the Pasteur Institute and the University of Paris in 1977 (University Paris Diderot). She completed her postdoctoral fellowship at the Pasteur Institute. She is currently a Professor and Head of the Unité des Interactions Bactéries Cellules at the Pasteur Institute. In 1998, she received the Richard Lounsbery Prize and the L'Oréal-UNESCO Award for Women in Science. She was awarded the Balzan Prize for Infectious Diseases: Basic and Clinical Aspects in 2013.

== Works ==
Cossart's research has focused on infection by intracellular bacteria, and in particular the infectious agent Listeria monocytogenes.

Listeria is a food-borne bacterial pathogen responsible for numerous illnesses and a mortality rate of 30%. The bacteria is one of the best models of intracellular parasitism because it is particularly hardy, able to survive in a variety of cells, cross multiple host barriers, and spreads through ActA, the protein responsible for actin-based motility. Cossart's work has shed light on the genetic and biochemical processes that make Listeria so effective and lethal, identifying the bsh gene; regulatory mechanisms such as an RNA thermosensor that control expression of the virulence genes such as bsh; and the ways in which Listeria enters cells and crosses physiological barriers such as the blood–brain barrier, the intestinal barrier, and the placental barrier. The discovery by Cossart's lab of the interaction between L. monocytogenes' protein, internalin, and its cell receptor, E-cadherin, was the first such study that successfully demonstrated the molecular mechanism that permits a bacterial agent to cross the placental barrier.

In 2009 Cossart published what she describes as the first "bacterial operon map"—the transcriptional program that regulates Listeria's behavior in different environmental conditions. By comparing the sequences of Listeria drawn from soil and drawn from the human gut, Cossart identified non-coding RNAs that contribute to Listeria's virulence, identified additional RNA repressors, and determined that riboswitches can act both downstream and upstream.

As part of her work she has also developed important biological tools, including a transgenic mouse that was the first animal model to overcome bacterial species-specificity. The mouse carried a human version of a host cell membrane receptor that L. monocytogenes used to enter cells.

== Significant publications ==
- Cossart, Pascale; Boquet, Patrice; Normark, Staffan; Rappuoli, Rino, eds. (29 November 2004). Cellular Microbiology. Washington, DC, USA: ASM Press. doi:10.1128/9781555817633. ISBN 978-1-68367-203-6.
- Finlay, B. Brett (2001). "Cracking Listeria' s Password". Science. 292 (5522). American Association for the Advancement of Science (AAAS): 1665–1667. doi:10.1126/science.1062045. ISSN 0036-8075. PMID 11387462. S2CID 12009460.
- Toledo-Arana, Alejandro; Dussurget, Olivier; Nikitas, Georgios; Sesto, Nina; Guet-Revillet, Hélène; Balestrino, Damien; Loh, Edmund; Gripenland, Jonas; Tiensuu, Teresa; Vaitkevicius, Karolis; Barthelemy, Mathieu; Vergassola, Massimo; Nahori, Marie-Anne; Soubigou, Guillaume; Régnault, Béatrice; Coppée, Jean-Yves; Lecuit, Marc; Johansson, Jörgen; Cossart, Pascale (17 May 2009). "The Listeria transcriptional landscape from saprophytism to virulence". Nature. 459 (7249). Springer Science and Business Media LLC: 950–956. Bibcode:2009Natur.459..950T. doi:10.1038/nature08080. ISSN 0028-0836. PMID 19448609. S2CID 4341657.

== Awards, prizes, and honorary lectures ==
- Carlos J. Finlay Prize for Microbiology (1995)
- Louis Rapkine Medal (1997)
- Richard Lounsbery Award (1998)
- Helena Rubenstein / UNESCO Award for Women in Science Leadership (1998)
- Corresponding member, French Academy of Sciences (1999)
- Nestle Prize "L’homme et sa nutrition", (2000)
- Louis Pasteur Gold Medal, Swedish Society of Medicine, (2000)
- Howard Hughes Medical Institute, International Research Scholar, 2000–2005, 2005–2011, 2012–2017
- Member, German Academy of Sciences Leopoldina (2001)
- Valade Prize, Fondation de France (2003)
- Margaret Pittman Lecture, National Institutes of Health (2003)
- Member, American Academy of Microbiology (2004)
- GlaxoSmithKline International Member of the Year Award (2007)
- Descartes Prize (2007)
- ERC Advanced Grant Award (2008)
- Member of the European Academy of Microbiology, (2009)
- President, Conseil Scientifique of the Pasteur Institute
- Member, French Conseil National de la Science
- Robert Koch Prize (2007)
- Louis-Jeantet Prize for Medicine (2008)
- René DESCARTES Prize (2008) for collaborative transnational research, Brussels, (2008)
- ERC Advanced Grant Award (2008–2014, 2015–2019)
- Foreign member, Royal Society of London (2010)
- Robert Koch Medal of the Robert Koch Institute, Berlin, Germany (2010)
- Van Deenen Medal of the Institute of Biomembranes, Utrecht, The Nertherlands (2011)
- Helmotz International Fellow Award, Berlin, Germany (2013)
- Balzan Prize (2013)
- H.P.R. Seeliger Award, Wurzburg, Germany (2013)
- Foreign Member of the National Academy of Medicine (NAM), U.S. (2014)
- FEBS/EMBO Women in Science Award (2014)
- Jürgen Manchot-Guest Professorship 2014, Düsseldorf, Germany, (2014)
- Doctor honoris causa of the University of Birmingham, United Kingdom (2015)
- Associated member of the Académie Nationale de Pharmacie, Paris (2016)
- Ernst Jung Gold Medal for Medicine from the Jung Foundation (2017)
- Prix René et Andrée Duquesne, Paris, France (2018)
- Heinrich Wieland Prize, Munich, Germany (2018)
- FEMS Lwoff Award (2019)
- Honorary Doctorate, Karolinska Institute, Stockholm (2020)
- Selman A. Waksman Award in Microbiology, NAS (2021), National Academy of Science, Washington, U.S.
- Grand Officer of the Legion of Honor in 2020 (commander in 2013, officer in 2007)
- Commander of the Ordre national du Mérite in 2010
