= Paracytophagy =

Process whereby a cell engulfs a protrusion extending from a neighboring cell

Paracytophagy (from Ancient Greek para 'nearby', kytos 'cell' and phagy 'eating') is the cellular process whereby a cell engulfs a protrusion which extends from a neighboring cell. This protrusion may contain material which is actively transferred between the cells. The process of paracytophagy was first described as a crucial step during cell-to-cell spread of the intracellular bacterial pathogen Listeria monocytogenes, and is also commonly observed in Shigella flexneri. Paracytophagy allows these intracellular pathogens to spread directly from cell to cell, thus escaping immune detection and destruction. Studies of this process have contributed significantly to our understanding of the role of the actin cytoskeleton in eukaryotic cells.

== Actin cytoskeleton ==
Schematic of actin comet tail formation by Listeria using ActA. The nucleation complex Arp2/3 is recruited to ActA, a WASP mimic. Actin filament polymerization then takes place at the posterior end of the bacterium, propelling it through the host cell cytoplasm in the anterior direction.

Actin is one of the main cytoskeletal proteins in eukaryotic cells. The polymerization of actin filaments is responsible for the formation of pseudopods, filopodia and lamellipodia during cell motility. Cells actively build actin microfilaments that push the cell membrane towards the direction of advance.

=== Nucleation factors and the Arp2/3 complex ===
Microtubule nucleation factors are enhancers of actin polymerization and contribute to the formation of the trimeric polymerization nucleus. This is a structure required to initiate the process of actin filament polymerization in a stable and efficient way. Nucleation factors such as WASP (Wiskott-Aldrich syndrome protein) help to form the seven-protein Arp2/3 nucleation complex, which resembles two actin monomers and therefore allows for easier formation of the polymerization nucleus. Arp2/3 is able to cap the trailing ("minus") end of the actin filament, allowing for faster polymerization at the "plus" end. It can also bind to the side of existing filaments to promote filament branching.

=== WASP analogs used by pathogens for intracellular motility ===
Certain intracellular pathogens such as the bacterial species Listeria monocytogenes and Shigella flexneri can manipulate host cell actin polymerization to move through the cytosol and spread to neighboring cells (see below). Studies of these bacteria, especially of Listeria Actin assembly-inducing protein (ActA), have resulted in further understanding of the actions of WASP. ActA is a nucleation promoting factor that mimics WASP. It is expressed polarized to the posterior end of the bacterium, allowing Arp2/3-mediated actin nucleation. This pushes the bacterium in the anterior direction, leaving a trailing "comet tail" of actin. In the case of Shigella, which also moves using an actin comet tail, the bacterial factor recruits host cell WASPs in order to promote actin nucleation.

== Exchange of cellular material between adjacent cells ==
Cells can exchange material through various mechanisms, such as by secreting proteins, releasing extracellular vesicles such as exosomes or microvesicles, or more directly engulfing pieces of adjacent cells. In one example, filopodia-like protrusions, or tunneling nanotubes directed toward neighboring cells in a culture of rat PC12 cells have been shown to facilitate transport of organelles through transient membrane fusion. In another example, during bone marrow homing, cells of the surrounding bone engulf pieces of bone marrow hematopoietic cells. These osteoblasts make contact with hematopoietic stem-progenitor cells through membrane nanotubes, and pieces of the donor cells are transferred over time to various endocytic compartments of the target osteoblasts.

A distinct process known as trogocytosis, the exchange of lipid rafts or membrane patches between immune cells, can facilitate response to foreign stimuli. Moreover, exosomes have been shown to deliver not only antigens for cross-presentation, but also MHCII and co-stimulatory molecules for lymphocyte T activation. In non-immune cells, it has been demonstrated that mitochondria can be exchanged intercellularly to rescue metabolically non-viable cells lacking mitochondria. Mitochondrial transfer has also been observed in cancer cells.

=== Argosomes and melanosomes ===
Argosomes are derived from basolateral epithelial membranes and allow communication between adjacent cells. They were first described in Drosophila melanogaster, where they act as a vehicle for the spread of molecules through the epithelia of imaginal discs. Melanosomes are also transferred by filopodia from melanocytes to keratinocytes. This transfer involves a classic filopodial forming pathway, with Cdc42 and WASP as key factors.

Argosomes, melanosomes, and other examples of epithelial transfer have been compared with the process of paracytophagy, all of which can be viewed as special cases of intercellular material transfer between epithelial cells.

== Role in the life cycle of intracellular pathogens ==
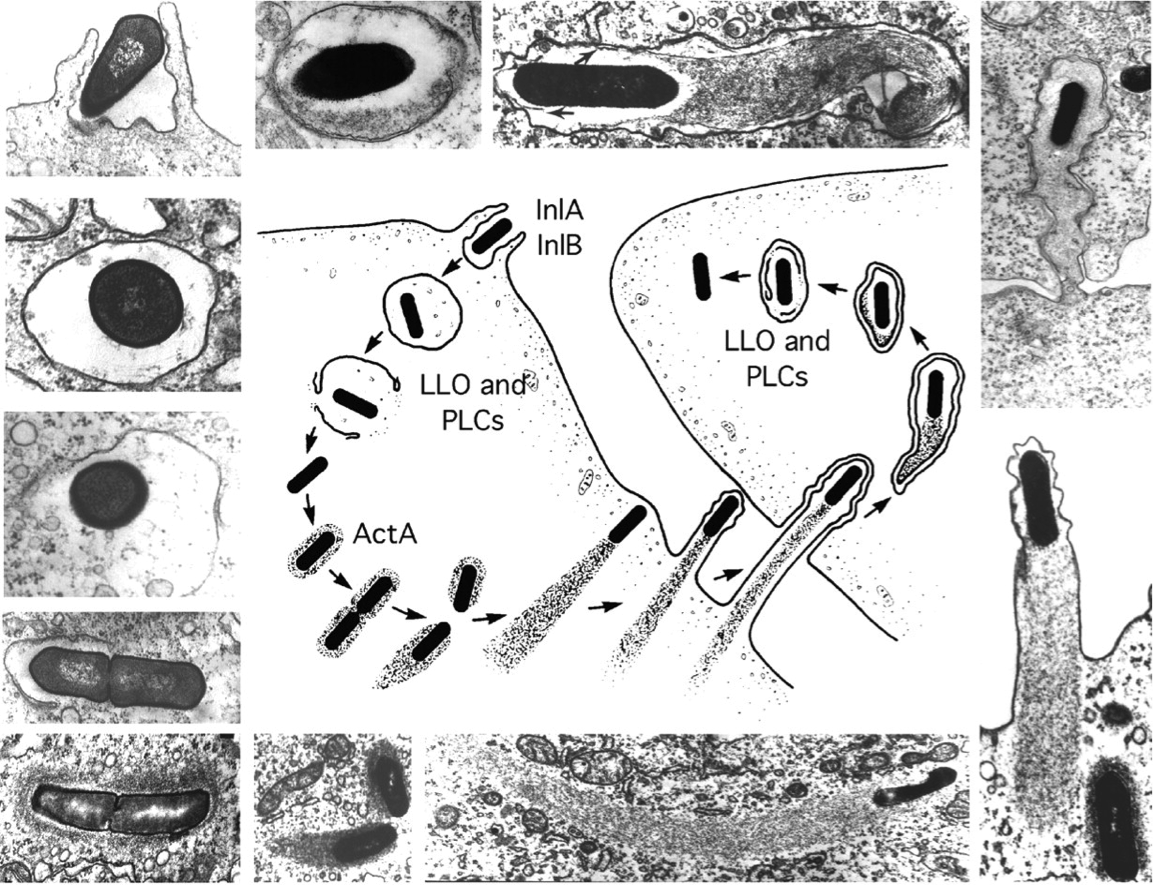
Stages in the intracellular life-cycle of Listeria monocytogenes. (Center) Cartoon depicting entry, escape from a vacuole, actin nucleation, actin-based motility, and cell-to-cell spread. (Outside) Representative electron micrographs from which the cartoon was derived.

The two main examples of paracytophagy are the modes of cell-cell transmission of Listeria monocytogenes and Shigella flexneri. In the case of Listeria, the process was first described in detail using electron microscopy and video microscopy. The following is a description of the process of cell-cell transmission of Listeria monocytogenes, primarily based on Robbins et al. (1999):

=== Early events ===
In an already infected "donor" cell, the Listeria bacterium expresses ActA, which results in formation of the actin comet tail and movement of the bacterium throughout the cytoplasm. When the bacterium encounters the donor cell membrane, it will either ricochet off it or adhere to it and begin to push outwards, distending the membrane and forming a protrusion of 3-18 μm. The close interaction between the bacterium and the host cell membrane is thought to depend on Ezrin, a member of the ERM family of membrane-associated proteins. Ezrin attaches the actin-propelled bacterium to the plasma membrane by crosslinking the actin comet tail to the membrane, and maintains this interaction throughout the protrusion process.

=== Invasion of target cell and secondary vacuole formation ===
As the normal site of infection is the gut columnar epithelium, cells are packed closely together and a cell protrusion from one cell will easily push into a neighboring "target" cell without rupturing the target cell membrane or the donor protrusion membrane. At this point, the bacterium at the tip of the protrusion will begin to undergo "fitful movement" caused by continuing polymerization of actin at its rear. After 7–15 minutes, the donor cell membrane pinches off and fitful movement ceases for 15–25 minutes due to depletion of ATP. Subsequently, the target membrane pinches off (taking 30–150 seconds) and the secondary vacuole containing the bacterium forms inside the target cell cytoplasm.

=== Secondary vacuole breakdown and target cell infection ===
Within 5 minutes, the target cell becomes infected when the secondary vacuole begins to acidify and the inner (donor cell-derived) membrane breaks down through the action of bacterial phospholipases (PI-PLC and PC-PLC). Shortly thereafter, the outer membrane breaks down as a result of the actions of the bacterial protein listeriolysin O which punctures the vacuolar membrane. A cloud of residual donor cell-derived actin persists around the bacterium for up to 30 minutes. The bacterial metalloprotease Mpl cleaves ActA in a pH-dependent fashion while the bacterium is still within the acidified secondary vacuole, but new ActA transcription is not required as pre-existing ActA mRNA can be utilized to translate new ActA protein. The bacterium regains motility and the infection proceeds.

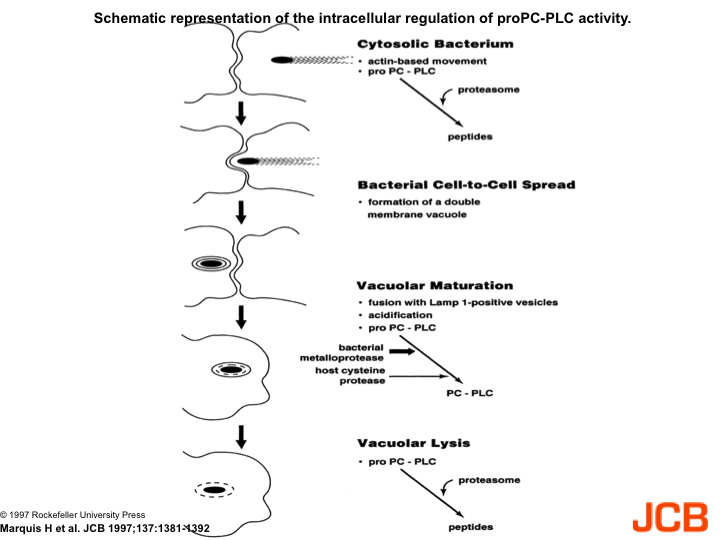
Cartoon of paracytophagy during Listeria infection, progressing to secondary vacuole formation and escape.

== Impact on disease ==
The most severe symptoms of Listeriosis result from involvement of the central nervous system (CNS). These severe and often fatal symptoms include meningitis, rhombencephalitis, and encephalitis. These forms of disease are a direct result of Listeria pathogenicity mechanisms at the cellular level. Listerial infection involving the CNS can occur via three known routes: through the blood, through intracellular delivery, or through neuronal intracellular spread. Paracytophagous cell to cell spread offers Listeria access to the CNS by the latter two mechanisms.

=== Paracytophagy in CNS infection by Listeria ===
In peripheral tissues, Listeria can invade cells such as monocytes and dendritic cells from infected endothelial cells via the paracytophagous mode of invasion. Using these phagocytic cells as vectors, Listeria travels throughout the nerves and reaches tissues usually inaccessible to other bacterial pathogens. Similar to the mechanism seen in HIV, infected leukocytes in the blood cross the blood brain barrier and transport Listeria into the CNS. Once in the CNS, cell to cell spreading causes associated damage leading to brain encephalitis and bacterial meningitis. Listeria uses phagocytic leukocytes as a "Trojan Horse" to gain access to a greater range of target cells.

In one study, mice treated with gentamicin via infusion pump displayed CNS and brain involvement during infection with Listeria, indicating that the population of bacteria responsible for severe pathogenesis resided within cells and was protected from the circulating antibiotic. Macrophages infected with Listeria pass the infection on to neurons more easily through paracytophagy than through extracellular invasion by free bacteria. The mechanism which specifically targets these infected cells to the CNS is currently not known. This Trojan horse function is also observed and thought to be important in early stages of infection where gut-to-lymph node infection is mediated by infected dendritic cells.

A second mechanism of reaching the brain tissue is achieved through intra-axonal transport. In this mechanism, Listeria travels along the nerves to the brain, resulting in encephalitis or transverse myelitis. In rats, the dorsal root ganglia can be infected directly by Listeria, and the bacteria can move in retrograde as well as anterograde direction through the nerve cells. The specific mechanisms involved in brain disease are not yet known, but paracytophagy is thought to have some role. Bacteria have not been shown to infect neuronal cells directly in an efficient manner, and the previously described macrophage hand-off is thought to be necessary for this mode of spread.

== See also ==
The process of paracytophagy is considered distinct from similar but unrelated processes such as phagocytosis and trogocytosis. Some related concepts include:

- Membrane nanotubes
- Intercellular signaling
