= P100 =

P100 may refer to:

== Automobiles ==
- Borgward P100, a German sedan
- Ford P100, a car-based pickup truck
- SsangYong Musso Sports, a South Korean SUV
- Tesla Model S P100, an American sedan
- Tesla Model X P100, an American SUV

== Aviation ==
- Bellanca P-100 Airbus, an American passenger aircraft
- Pottier P.100, a French civil utility aircraft
- Rogožarski R-100, a Yugoslav fighter trainer

== Science and technology ==
- Listeria virus P100, a bacteriophage
- Mannan-binding lectin-associated serine protease-2, an enzyme
- P100, a NIOSH air filtration rating
- P100, an event-related brain potential; see C1 and P1 (neuroscience)
- DSC-P100, a Sony digital camera
- Tesla P100, a GPU accelerator

== Ships ==
- HMAS Buccaneer (P 100), a patrol boat of the Royal Australian Navy
- NNS Andoni (P100), a seaward defense boat of the Nigerian Navy

== Other uses ==
- Papyrus 100, a biblical manuscript
- Project P-100, a video game
- P100, a state regional road in Latvia
