= Lovaxin C =

Lovaxin C is a live attenuated Listeria cancer vaccine that is under investigation (2008) and has entered clinical trials. It is under development at Advaxis. Note: Lovaxin C has been renamed ADXS11-001

== Background ==
The bacterial genus Listeria includes intracellular pathogenes able to induce a strong activation of the immune system. The vaccine is derived from bioengineered Listeria monocytogenes that have been attenuated and produce a tumor antigen. Lovaxin C specifically contains HPV-16-E7 antigen specific for cervical carcinoma. Women with cervical cancer are thought to be able to mount a more effective immune response against this cancer after stimulation with the vaccine.

The concept has been tested in a mouse model where the vaccine led to regression of renal and colon cancer.

== Phase I/II studies ==
In phase I/II trials 15 women with end-stage (IVb) cervical cancer were treated. Flu-like symptoms including fever and hypotension were encountered. While this study was conducted to establish dose tolerance, six of the 15 treated patients were still alive 2 years later, although their life expectancy at the beginning of the trial was six months or less.

Studies are planned to test the efficacy of Lovaxin C in patients with advanced cervical cancer.
