= Trogocytosis =

Cellular process

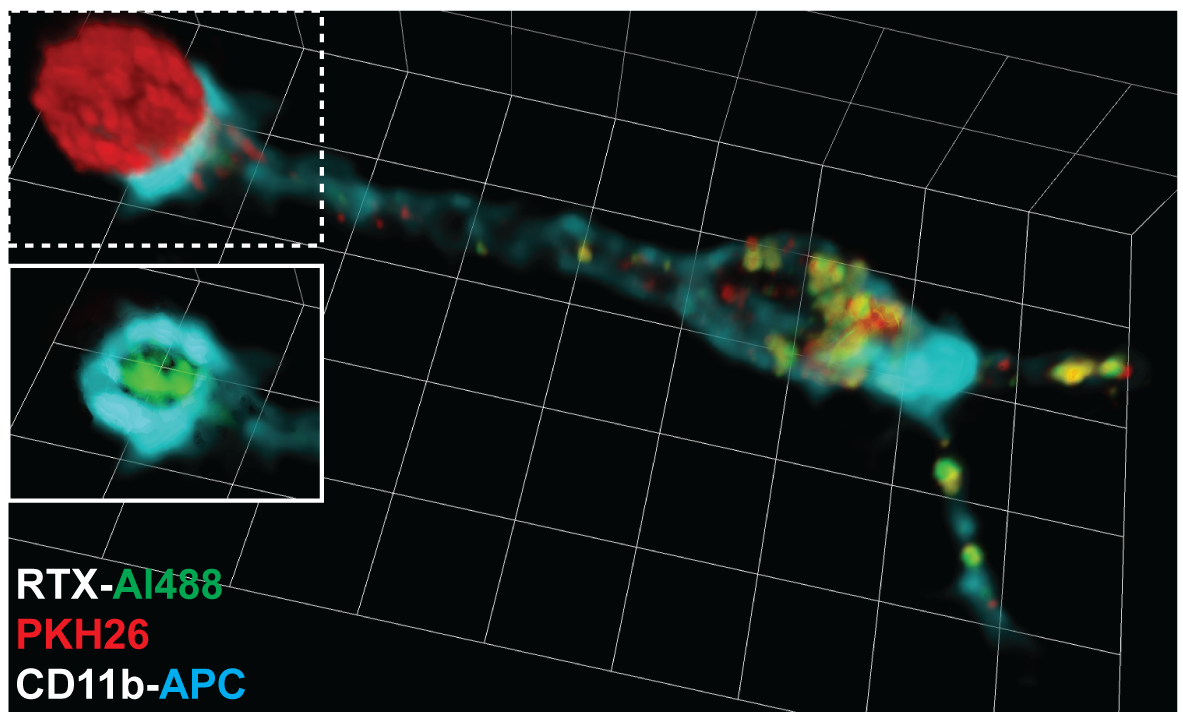
Volumetric reconstruction from confocal slices of a Ramos-RAW cell interface. RTX-Al488-coated (green), PKH26-labelled Ramos cells (red) were incubated with RAW cells for 45 minutes at 37°C. RAW cells were labelled with anti-CD11b-APC (cyan). The RAW cell has extensively trogocytosed both RTX and PKH26. Inset shows the dotted area above it without the PKH26 channel overlaid, revealing the concentration of RTX-Al488 at the cell-cell interface, otherwise depleted from the rest of the Ramos cell. Trogocytosis reaction was halted by fixation 45 min after co-incubation. Ramos cells are approximately 12 μm in diameter.

Trogocytosis (Greek: trogo; gnaw) is when a cell nibbles another cell. It is a process whereby lymphocytes (B, T and NK cells) conjugated to antigen-presenting cells extract surface molecules from these cells and express them on their own surface. The molecular reorganization occurring at the interface between the lymphocyte and the antigen-presenting cell during conjugation is also called "immunological synapse".

== Discovery ==
First indication for the existence of this process dates back late 70s when several research groups reported on the presence of unexpected molecules such as major histocompatibility complex molecules (MHCs) on T cells. The notion that membrane fragments, and not isolated molecules, could be captured by T cells on antigen-presenting cells was suggested by the capture of MHC molecules fused to the green fluorescent protein (GFP) in their intracellular portion. The demonstration that membrane fragments were involved in this transfer process came when fluorescent probes incorporated in the plasma membrane of the antigen-presenting cell as well as non-MHC molecules were found to be captured by T cells together with the antigen.

== Cell types ==
Trogocytosis has been initially documented in T, B, and NK cells both in vivo and in vitro. On T cells and B cells, trogocytosis is triggered when the T cell receptor (TCR) on T cells or B cell receptor (BCR) on B cells interacts with the antigen recognized on antigen-presenting cells. Like in lymphocytes, trogocytosis occurs with PMN (polymorphonuclear leukocytes, also known as granulocytes) and is associated with effective ADCC (Antibody dependent cell mediated cytotoxicity).

It was shown that in order to initiate ADCC in vitro, PMN's have to adhere to their target cells and form tight junctions with antibody opsonized tumor cells. This cell clustering precedes mutual membrane lipid exchange between effector and target cell during ADCC and does not happen in the absence of opsonizing antibodies. Trogocytosis also occurs in monocytes, and dendritic cells. Outside the immune system, similar transfer of membrane fragments have been documented between sperm and oocytes, a process thought to contribute to gamete fusion.

The term has been attributed to macrophages, such as the CNS resident microglia, which are able to partially remove small portions of neuronal axons during postnatal development.

== Mechanism of action ==
Trogocytosis involves the transfer of plasma membrane fragments from the presenting cell to the lymphocyte. Trogocytosis is specifically triggered by antigen receptor signalling on T and B cells, by killer inhibitory and killer activatory receptor on NK cells and by various receptors on other cells including Fc receptor and scavenger class A receptor. It is likely that trogocytosis does not involve the capture of vesicles such as exosomes secreted by antigen-presenting cells. Rather, molecules could move from antigen-presenting cells to lymphocytes conveyed by membrane nanotubes or membrane fragments could be torn by T cells due to physical forces required for immunological synapse formation and deformation. Depending on the two cell types involved in conjugates, trogocytosis can be unidirectional or bidirectional. Proteins transferred by trogocytosis are many and mostly include proteins inserted in or closely associated to the plasma membrane (proteins spanning the lipid bilayer or inserted in the extracellular or intracellular leaflets). For instance, human lymphocytes were recently shown to acquire the inner-membrane protein H-Ras, a G-protein vital for common lymphocyte functions and a prominent participant in human cancer, from the cells they scan. The transfer was cell contact-dependent and occurred in the context of cell-conjugate formation. Moreover, the acquisition of oncogenic H-RasG12V by NK- and T lymphocytes had important biological functions in the adopting lymphocytes: the transferred H-RasG12V induced ERK phosphorylation, increased interferon-γ and tumor necrosis factor-α secretion, enhanced lymphocyte proliferation, and augmented NK-mediated target cell killing.

Similarly, chimeric antigen receptors (CARs) can be transferred from engineered to non-engineered T cells. Recipient T cells do not express receptors specific for synthetic CAR molecules, suggesting that trogocytosis does not require a dedicated receptor to capture donor antigens. However, CAR transfer from donor to recipient T cells still depends on direct physical contact between their plasma membranes. Moreover, CAR-recipient cells can respond to antigen stimulation, indicating that the trogocytosed CAR molecule remains functional on recipient T cells.

== Physiological consequences ==
Trogocytosis can have physiological consequences in two ways: either because "recipient" cells acquire and make use of molecules they do not usually express or because «donor» cells are stripped of molecules, which may alter their interaction with cellular partners. Acquired molecules, such as regulatory molecules with extracellular or intracellular components might alter the lymphocytes activity and direct several lymphocyte functions, such as migration to the adequate injured tissues. Such gained plasma membrane fragments could also contribute to the capacity to proliferate, because lipids are highly energetic claiming components to establish. Trogocytosis might have appeared first in very primitive organisms to feed off other cells. Most of the biological functions identified for trogocytosis have been reported for lymphocytes and dendritic cells. Major findings along these lines are:

- cytotoxic T lymphocytes having captured antigenic peptide-MHC complexes can be killed by CTL specific for this antigen (a process termed fratricide)
- helper T lymphocyte having captured antigenic peptide-MHC complexes are involved in a negative regulatory feed-back loop leading to their inactivation
- dendritic cells stripped of antigenic peptide-MHC complexes by T cells through trogocytosis contribute to affinity maturation of T cell response by selecting high-affinity T cell
- down-modulation of costimulatory molecules on dendritic cells mediated by T cells leads to regulation of T cell response
- transfer of antigen between dendritic cells by trogocytosis favours reactivation of memory T cells at the expenses of naive T cells
- transfer of antigen between dendritic cells by trogocytosis contributes to allograft rejection

== Applications ==
=== In serotherapy ===
Therapeutic antibodies can be used to treat cancer. An example is rituximab, a therapeutic antibody used to treat chronic lymphocytic leukemia, recognizes the CD20 molecule expressed by tumor cells and leads to their elimination. However, using too much of the antibody results in part from the removal of rituximab-CD20 complexes from the tumor cell surface by monocytes through trogocytosis. This effect leads to tumors cell escape by antigenic modulation. Reducing the dose of therapeutic antibodies to limit the extent of trogocytosis might improve their therapeutic efficacy.

Epratuzumab (a CD22 Mab) acts using trogocytosis to transfer CD22 and other B-cell proteins from B cells to effector cells.

=== As immunomonitoring tools ===
TRAP assays (TRogocytosis Analysis Protocol) allow to identify, characterize and purify T and B cells recognizing their specific antigen based on their ability to extract molecules (in that case, fluorescent probes) from the plasma membrane of antigen-presenting cells. These assays require equipment such as a flow cytometer but are otherwise very cheap, easy to perform, fast (can be performed within 3 hours) and applicable to any population of T or B cells. TRAP assays have been successfully used to detect T cell responses against viral infections, cancer, autoimmune diseases and vaccines.

== See also ==
- Phagocytosis – Cell membrane engulfing a large particle
- Paracytophagy – Process whereby a cell engulfs a protrusion extending from a neighboring cell
