= 2014 Macedonia listeriosis outbreak =

Disease outbreak in Macedonia

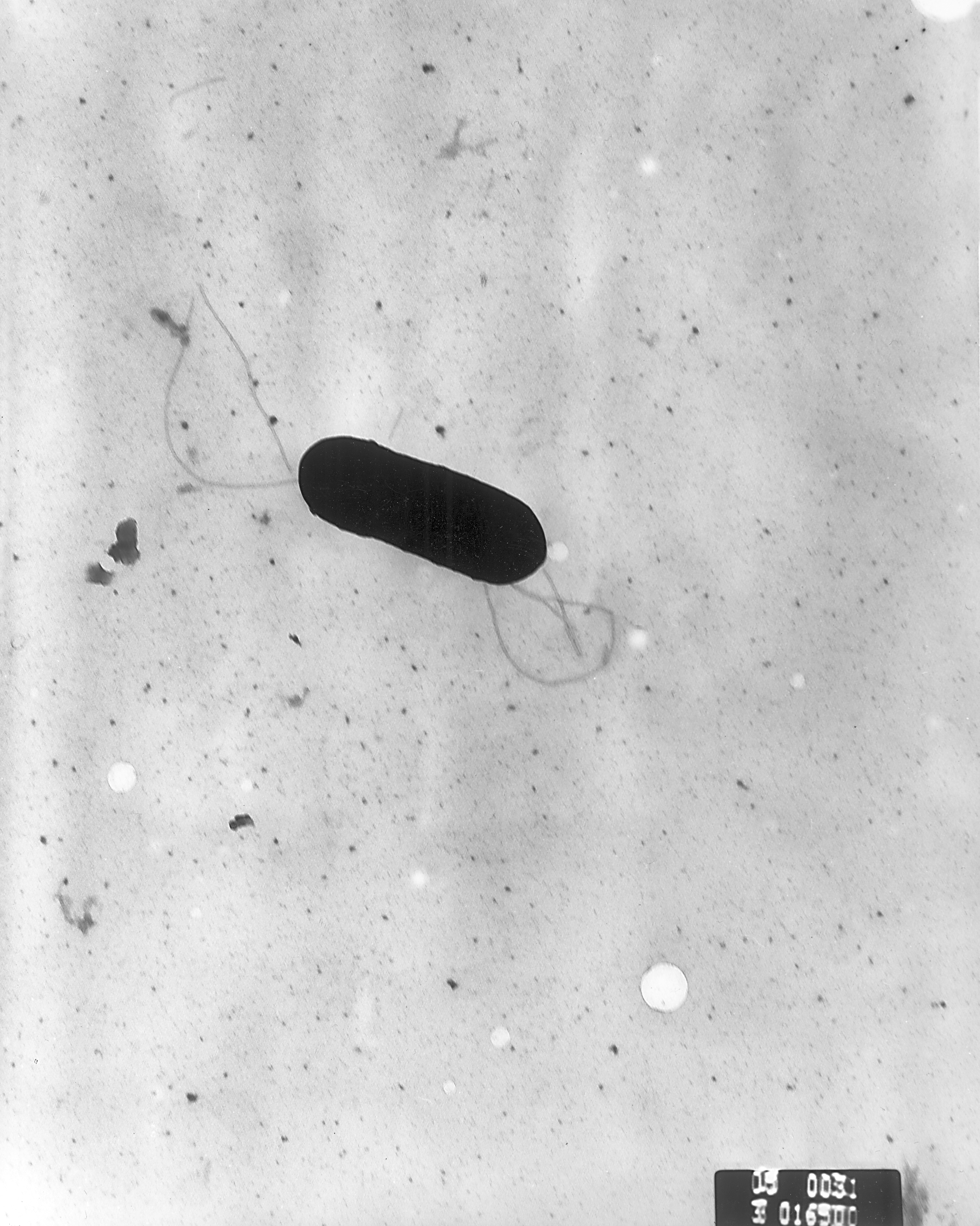
- Listeria monocytogenes PHIL 2287 lores
- Location: Macedonia
- Date: 2014

The 2014 Macedonia listeriosis outbreak was an outbreak caused by Listeria food poisoning. Ten patients, of whom five died, were infected with Listeria bacteria throughout July and August 2014. After Macedonia’s food safety inspectorate stated smoked pork produced by the manufacturer Ekstra was the cause of the fatalities, overall sales of meat dropped sharply in Macedonia.

== See also ==
- Listeriosis
