= Listeriosis in animals =

Bacterial disease of animals

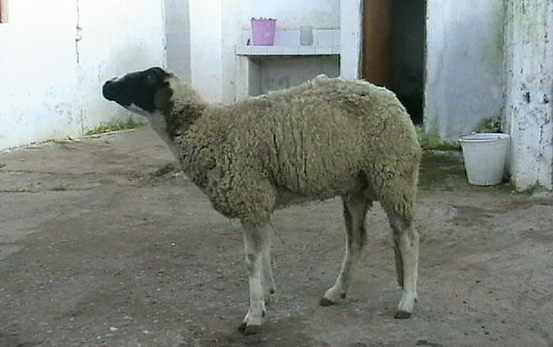
Encephalitic form in a female sheep

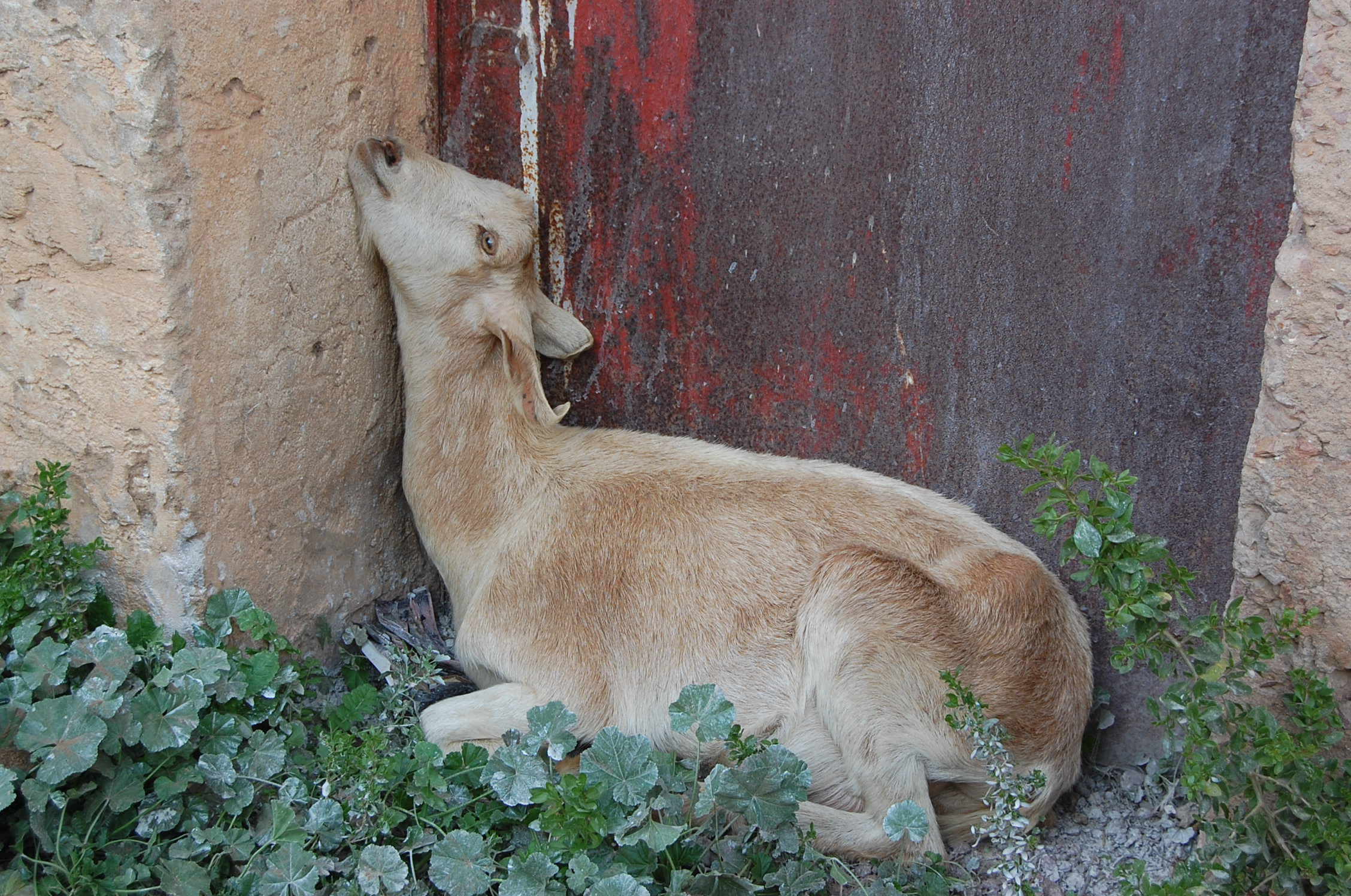
in a goat

Listeriosis is an infectious but not contagious disease caused by the bacterium Listeria monocytogenes, far more common in domestic animals (domestic mammals and poultry), especially ruminants, than in human beings. It can also occur in feral animals—among others, game animals—as well as in poultry and other birds.

== Aetiology ==
The causative bacterium lives in the soil and in poorly made silage (In Iceland, the disease is called "silage sickness".)

== Epidemiology ==
The portal of infection is uncertain, but ingestion of infected feed seems the most usual way. However, inhalation and conjunctival contamination might also play a role.

The disease is not contagious.

The disease is sporadic, but can occur as farm outbreaks in ruminants.

Listeriosis in farm animals is important economically in Europe, North America, Australia and New Zealand. It is less common in tropical and subtropical areas. However, use of silage in those countries, most common now than it used to be, may increase the prevalence of the disease in those countries.

== Clinical forms ==
=== In all animals ===
Three main forms are usually recognized throughout the affected species:

- encephalitis, the most common form in ruminants. Meningitis or meningoencephalitis are possibilities.
- late abortion
- gastrointestinal sepsis with liver damage, in monogastric species as well as in preruminant calves and lambs

== In sheep and goat ==
In sheep, the disease is also called "circling disease". The most obvious signs for the veterinarians are neurological, especially lateral deviation of the neck and head, opisthotonus or emprosthotonus.

Other signs comprises compulsive movements of the lips, facial and masticatory muscles, with food staying in mouth.

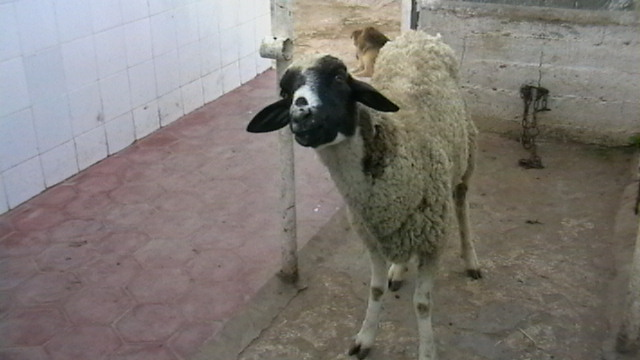
lateral deviation of head and neck in sheep

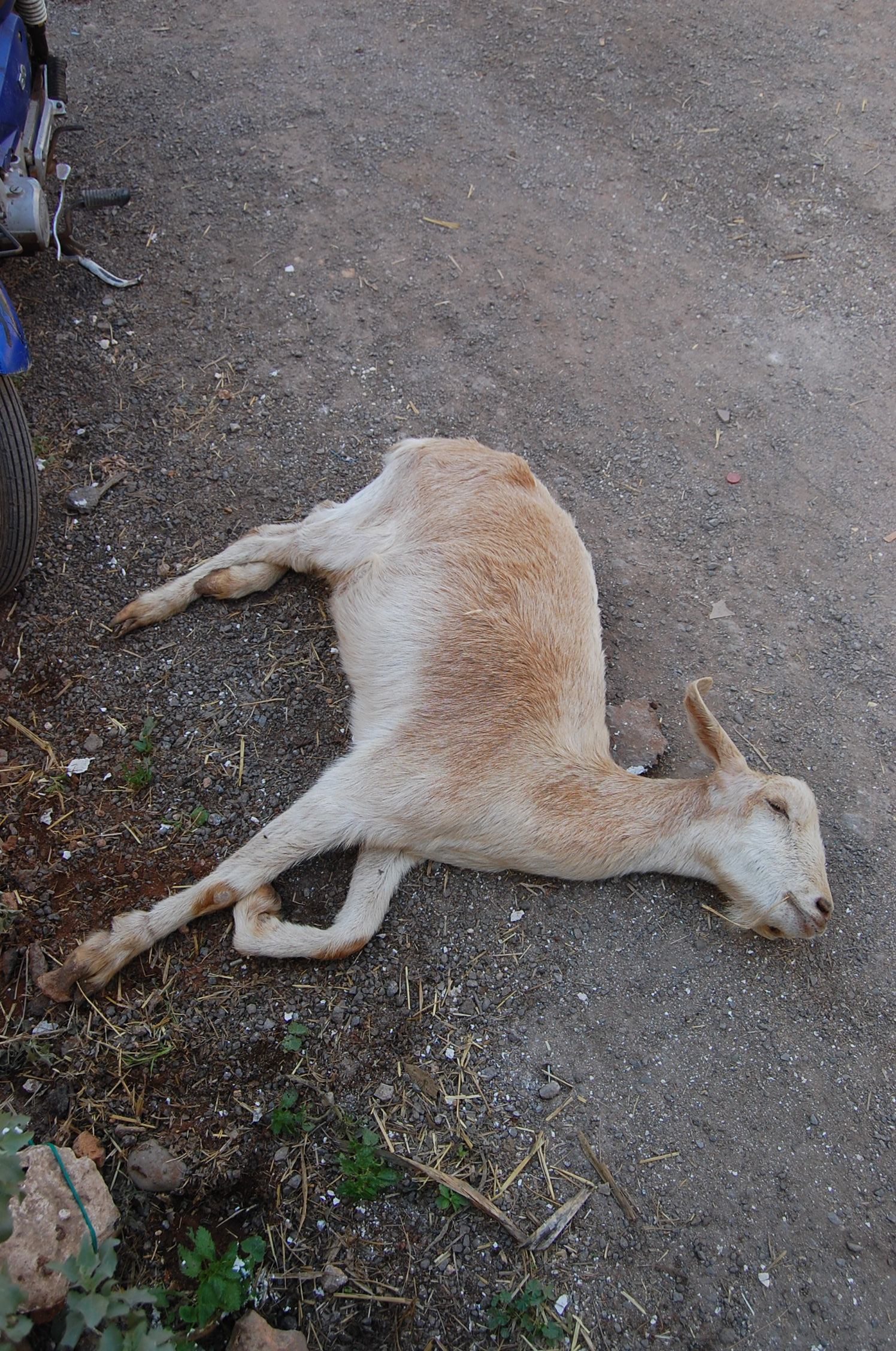
goat in lateral recumbency with opisthotonus

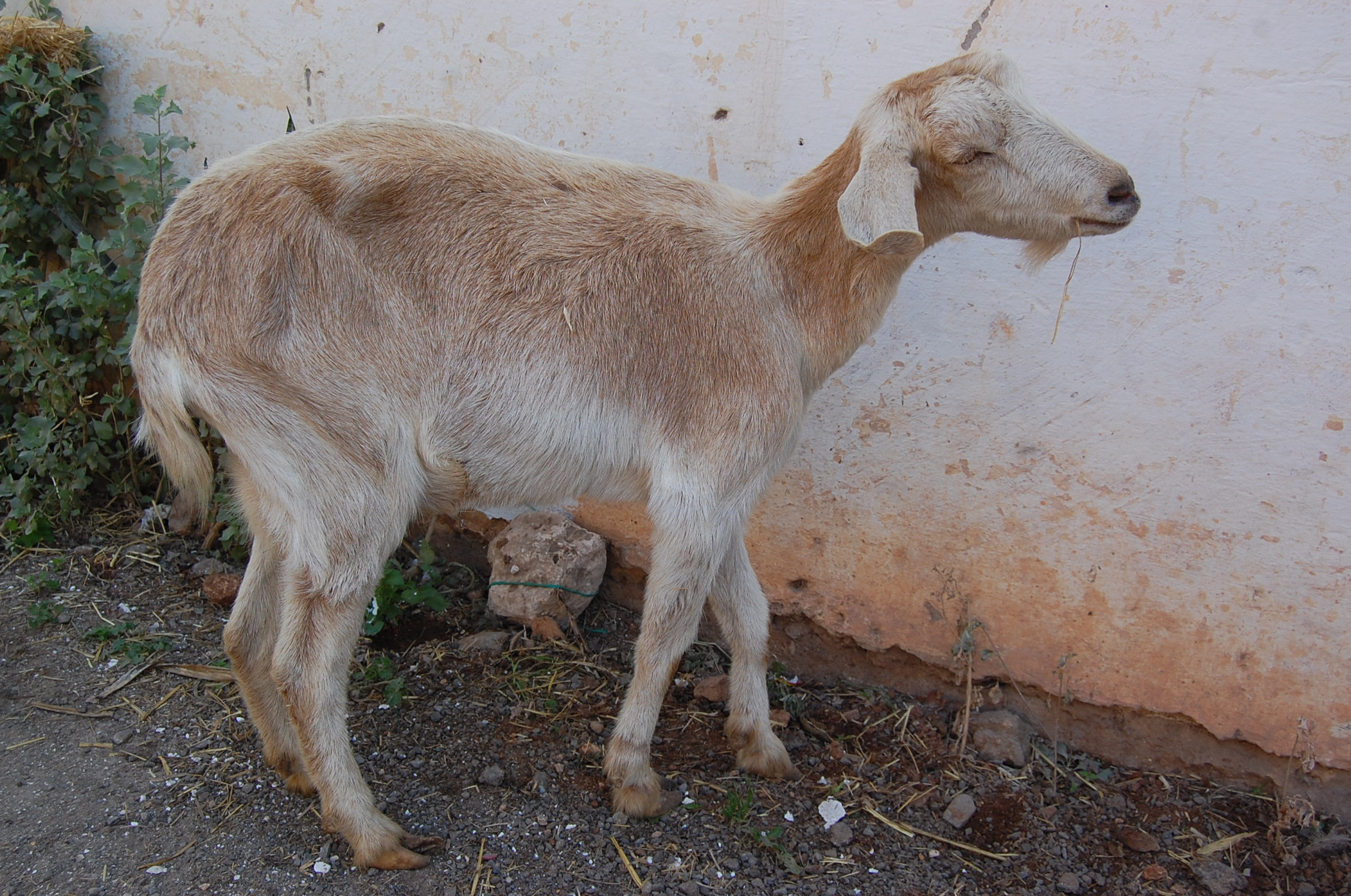
same stood up soon after, with twisted head

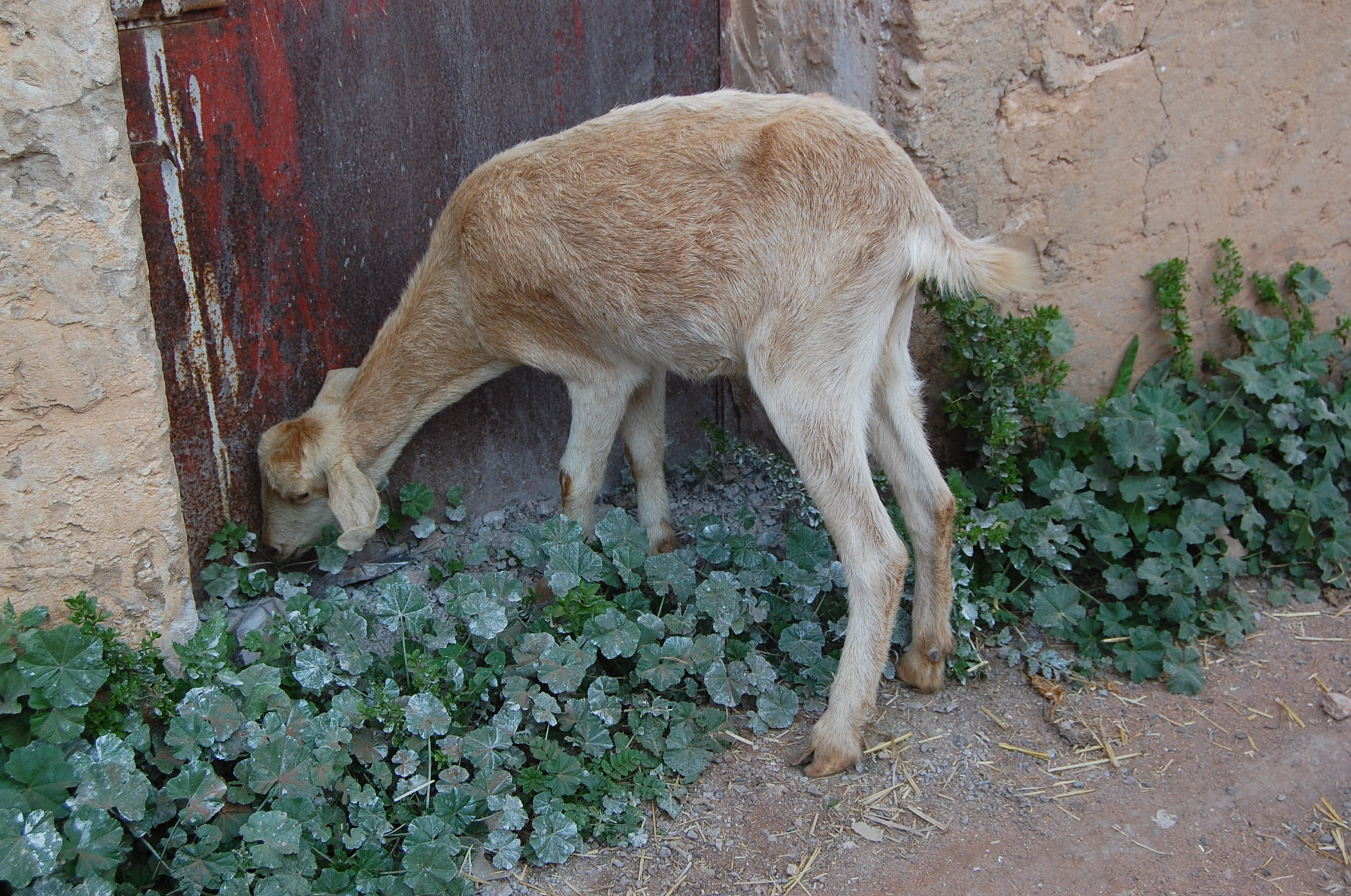
wanting to browse

== In cattle ==
In cattle, the most common sign is encephalitis, with fever, blindness, pressing against fixed objects, dullness, facial paralysis and circling.

The cow can follow the fence until it finds a corner, then staying there for a long time, pushing against the fence.

The animal wants to eat, but food remains within the mouth, with drooling saliva, because of paralysis of the masticatory muscles.

Following nervous location of the lesions, the signs may be different from one sick animal to another.

In adult cattle, the course of the disease is one to two weeks, but in calves, it is more acute.

Abortion can occur but it is not linked to nervous syndrome.

== Treatment ==
Listeriosis in animals can sometimes be cured with antibiotics (tetracyclines and benzyl penicillin) when diagnosed early. Goats, for example, can be treated upon noticing facial paralysis. But the condition is generally fatal.
