= Internalin =

Internalins are surface proteins found on Listeria monocytogenes. They exist in two known forms, InlA and InlB. They are used by the bacteria to invade mammalian cells via cadherins transmembrane proteins and Met receptors respectively. The exact role of these proteins and their invasiveness in vivo is not completely understood. In cultured cells, InlA is necessary to facilitate Listeria entry into human epithelial cells, while InlB is necessary for Listeria internalisation in several other cell types, including hepatocytes, fibroblasts, and epithelioid cells. Internalins are mainly surface-exposed virulence factors present in a number of Gram-positive bacteria whose role ranges from recognition of cellular receptors to aid in pathogen entry to escape from autophagy.

Listeria poses a particular threat to pregnant women because of its ability to cross the placental blood barrier through the combined binding of both InIA and InIB to host cells. Research has shown that only the combined binding of these two virulence factors allows the bacteria to cross that barrier. This is not the case in mice and guinea pigs whose cells only have affinity for InIB in mice and InIA in guinea pigs. InlB blocks the action of cytotoxic T-cells and extents the infected cell lifespan.

== See also ==
- Cadherin
- Pascale Cossart
