= Advaxis =

American Pharmaceutical Company

Advaxis Inc.
- Type: Public
- Traded as: OTCQX: ADXS
- Industry: Biotechnology; Healthcare
- Predecessor: Great Expectations, Inc.
- Founded: March 1, 2002; 24 years ago, in the United States
- Headquarters: Princeton, New Jersey, United States
- Key people: Ken Berlin (CEO); Dr. Robert Petit (CSO); Molly Henderson (CFO) Dr. Andres Gutierrez (CMO)
- Products: Immunotherapies for cancer
- Website: www.advaxis.com

Advaxis Immunotherapies Inc. was an American company that focused on the discovery, development, and commercialization of immunotherapies based on a genetically engineered platform based on Listeria monocytogenes (aka Lm). The company merged with Ayala Pharmaceuticals, with the newly formed company beginning operations under the name Ayala Pharmaceuticals in January 2023.

The Lm-based platform on which the company's products were based involves the use of an attenuated Lm, which secretes an antigen/adjuvant fusion protein and stimulates a patient's immune system (specifically their T cells) to mount an immune response to the secreted antigen. If the antigen is specifically found on cancerous cells, the result is an immune response targeting and eliminating the cancer. Treatments developed using this paradigm are referred to as Lm-LLO immunotherapies.

The company had over fifteen constructs in various stages of development, both directly and through strategic collaborations with centers, such as the National Cancer Institute, Cancer Research UK, the Wistar Institute, the University of Pennsylvania, and the Department of Homeland Security,among others. The company also had a veterinary medicine program that was evaluating an Lm-LLO-based immunotherapy in a Phase 1 study in canine osteosarcoma.

== Corporate history and governance ==
=== Beginnings ===
Advaxis was a Delaware corporation when it was acquired by a shell corporation in November 2004. The acquiring company was Great Expectations, which was incorporated in Colorado in June 1987. The only operating company owned by Great Expectations was Advaxis. In December 2004, a month after the acquisition, Great Expectations changed its name to Advaxis, and 18 months later it reincorporated as a Delaware corporation. The company's official 'date of inception' is 1 March 2002.

=== Partnerships ===
In 2014, Advaxis entered a co-development and commercialization agreement with India's Biocon for the ADXS-HPV therapeutic in the Indian market, addressing HPV-associated cancers, including cervical cancer.^{,}

== Advaxis Technology ==
Advaxis immunotherapies are based on a platform technology using live attenuated Listeria monocytogenes (Lm) that are bioengineered to secrete an antigen/adjuvant fusion protein. The vectors infect the key elements of the immune system, and the secreted antigen/adjuvant fusion protein redirects the immune response against the cancer itself. The adjuvant also reduces the cancer's defense against this immune attack. The company's platform technology is based on preclinical research by Yvonne Paterson, Professor of Microbiology at the University of Pennsylvania, and Fellow of the American Academy for the Advancement of Science.

== Clinical Development Program ==
ADXS-HPV was in Phase 2 trials for HPV-associated diseases (cervical intraepithelial neoplasia (CIN), cervical cancer, and HPV-associated head and neck cancer).

In 2009, Advaxis published the results of the first Phase 1 trial with the first Lm-LLO-based immunotherapy, ADXS-HPV in Vaccine (19 June 2009 / Volume 27, Issue 30). This study assessed side effects associated with increasing doses of ADXS-HPV in patients with metastatic, refractory, recurrent cervical cancer. Vaccine (19 June 2009 / Volume 27, Issue 30) This study demonstrated that a live-attenuated Lm-LLO-based immunotherapy could be administered to human subjects and was tolerated, and a maximum tolerated dose was established. 4 of 13 evaluable patients experienced increased survival and tumor shrinkage.

== Veterinary Medicine Program ==
- Advaxis signed a CRADA (Cooperative Research and Development Agreement) with the Department of Homeland Security. The DHS initially conducted a pilot “proof-of-concept” study on cattle investigating the safety of Advaxis immunotherapies.
- Advaxis began a Phase 1 study with the University of Pennsylvania School of Veterinary Medicine to evaluate an Lm-LLO-based immunotherapy in a Phase 1 study in canine osteosarcoma.
