= Meningoencephalitis =

Infection or inflammation of the brain and its surrounding membranes

- Meninges of the central nervous system
- Specialty: Infectious disease, neurology
- Symptoms: Fever, headache, neck stiffness, photophobia
- Diagnostic method: Based on symptoms; supported by lumbar puncture, blood tests, medical imaging, and/or electroencephalogram

Meningoencephalitis is a medical condition involving simultaneous inflammation of the brain (encephalitis) and of the meninges, the protective membranes of the brain and spinal cord (meningitis). The symptoms resemble those of both conditions, including fever, intense headache, neck stiffness, nausea, and vomiting. Meningoencephalitis is often fatal when untreated, and survivors can be left with long-term neurological conditions.

Meningoencephalitis may begin as inflammation of either the brain or meninges that then progresses to involve both regions. Infectious causes include viruses, bacteria, fungi, or protozoan parasites. The inflammation can also be non-infectious in origin, such as autoimmune diseases.

== Signs and symptoms ==
Signs of meningoencephalitis include unusual behavior, personality changes, nausea, and thinking problems.

Symptoms may include headache, fever, pain in neck movement, light sensitivity, and seizure.

== Causes ==
The organisms which cause meningoencephalitis include bacterial pathogens, protozoans, and viruses.

=== Bacterial ===
Veterinarians have observed meningoencephalitis in animals infected with listeriosis, caused by the pathogenic bacteria L. monocytogenes. Meningitis and encephalitis already present in the brain or spinal cord of an animal may simultaneously form into meningeoencephalitis. The bacteria commonly targets the sensitive structures of the brain stem. L. monocytogenes meningoencephalitis has been documented to significantly increase the number of cytokines, such as interleukin-1beta (IL-1β), IL-12, and IL-15, leading to toxic effects on the brain.

Meningoencephalitis may be one of the severe complications of diseases originating from several Rickettsia species, such as Rickettsia rickettsii (causes Rocky Mountain spotted fever [RMSF]), Rickettsia conorii, Rickettsia prowazekii (causes epidemic louse-borne typhus), and Rickettsia africae. It can impair the cranial nerves, cause paralysis to the eyes, and sudden hearing loss. Meningoencephalitis is a rare, late-stage manifestation of tick-borne ricksettial diseases, such as RMSF and human monocytotropic ehrlichiosis (HME), caused by Ehrlichia chaffeensis (a species of rickettsiales bacteria).

Other bacteria that can cause meningoencephalitis are Mycoplasma pneumoniae, Tuberculosis, Borrelia (Lyme disease), and Leptospirosis.

=== Viral ===
Several viral infections can cause meningoencephalitis, including:

- Tick-borne encephalitis
- West Nile virus
- Measles
- Epstein–Barr virus
- Varicella-zoster virus
- Enterovirus
- Herpes simplex virus type 1
- Herpes simplex virus type 2
- Rabies virus
- Adenovirus
  - Meningoencephalitis is almost solely seen in heavily immunocompromised patients.
- Mumps
  - A relatively common cause of meningoencephalitis. However, most cases are mild, and mumps meningoencephalitis generally does not result in death or neurologic sequelae.
- HIV
  - A very small number of individuals exhibit meningoencephalitis at the primary stage of infection.

=== Autoimmune ===
- Antibodies targeting amyloid beta peptide proteins have been used during research on Alzheimer's disease.
- Anti-N-methyl-D-aspartate (anti-NMDA) receptor antibodies, which are also associated with seizures and a movement disorder, are related to anti-NMDA receptor encephalitis.
- Nonvasculitic autoimmune inflammatory meningoencephalitis (NAIM) can be divided into glial fibrillary acidic protein negative (GFAP-) and GFAP positive (GFAP+) cases. The second is related to the autoimmune GFAP astrocytopathy.

=== Protozoal ===
The protozoal organisms that cause meningoencephalitis include:

- Naegleria fowleri (percolozoa)
- Trypanosoma brucei (euglenozoa)
- Toxoplasma gondii (apicomplexa)

=== Animal ===
The nematode Halicephalobus gingivalis is an exceptionally rare cause of meningoencephalitis.

=== Other/multiple ===
Other causes of meningoencephalitis include granulomatous meningoencephalitis and vasculitis. The fungus, Cryptococcus neoformans, can symptomatically manifest within the central nervous system (CNS) as meningoencephalitis, with hydrocephalus being a very characteristic finding due to the unique thick polysaccharide capsule of the organism.

== Diagnosis ==
Clinical diagnosis includes evaluation for the presence of recurrent or recent herpes infection, fever, headache, altered mental status, convulsions, disturbance of consciousness, and focal signs. Testing of cerebrospinal fluid is usually performed.

== Treatment ==
Meningoencephalitis caused by bacteria can be treated with antibiotic drugs. Antiviral therapy, such as acyclovir and ganciclovir, works best when given to the individual as early as possible. Individuals may also be treated with interferon as immune therapy. Symptomatic therapy can be applied as needed. A high fever can be treated by physical regulation of body temperature. Seizures can be treated with antiepileptic drugs. High intracranial pressure can be treated with drugs such as mannitol.

== See also ==
- Meningitis
- Meningism
- Primary amoebic meningoencephalitis
- Encephalitis
- Naegleria fowleri
