= Listeria virus P100 =

Virus classification
- (unranked): Virus
- Realm: Duplodnaviria
- Kingdom: Heunggongvirae
- Phylum: Uroviricota
- Class: Caudoviricetes
- Family: Herelleviridae
- Genus: Pecentumvirus
- Species: Pecentumvirus P100

Species of virus

Listeria virus P100 is a virus of the family Herelleviridae, genus Pecentumvirus.

Listeria virus P100 has been proposed as food additive to control Listeria monocytogenes, the bacteria responsible for Listeriosis. Listeriosis is an infection that is the result of consuming food that is contaminated by Listeria monocytogenes.

As a member of the group I of the Baltimore classification, Listeria virus P100 is a dsDNA virus. P100 shares a nonenveloped morphology consisting of a head and a tail separated by a neck similar to other members of the Myoviridae family. Virions are independent particles that exist separate from cells. They are spread by attaching to a host cell and injecting a double stranded DNA; the host then transcribes and translates it to manufacture new particles. Host cell DNA polymerases is needed to replicate its genetic content, therefore, the process is highly dependent on the cell cycle.

== Characteristics ==
Listeria virus P100 targets Listeria monocytogenes, the bacterial pathogen responsible for listeriosis. Listeria monocytogenes is the only human pathogen that causes Listeriosis. Unlike most phages infecting bacteria in the genus Listeria, Listeria virus P100 is a virulent phage. This means that it destroys the host cell through lysis which is when the membrane of a cell is broken down. This makes phage P100 absolutely lethal to Listeria after infection. Additionally, P100 has a very large host range, which accounts for over 95% of all bacteria types within Listeria that appear in food.

== Treatment potential ==
In the US, there are around 1600 Listerosis cases and 260 fatalities. Listeriosis is most commonly observed in immunocompromised, pregnant, elderly or young people. Listeria monocytogenes can grow on a variety of foods, such as cheese, meat, poultry, vegetables, and seafood. Listeria monocytogenes may even be detected on surfaces that have had contact with the previously mentioned foods. Listeria virus P100 has been shown to be generally stable under storage conditions. Listeria virus P100 is a key component to the food additive Listex P100, which has received GRAS (generally recognized as safe) status by the US food and drug administration and is currently approved for use in the European Union as well. PhageGuard is a company that developed an organic, FDA approved product to combat Listeria. The company prides themselves on not affecting the smell, texture or taste of the food they use their product on while eliminating Listeria monocytogenes.

== Genome ==
Its linear genome contains 131,385 base pairs that encode 174 open reading frames and 18 tRNAs. The requirement for each open reading frame (ORF) was the presence of one of the following start codons: ATG, TTG, or GTG as well as a suitable ribosomal binding site and a minimum length of 40 encoded amino acids.

P100 appears to be closely related to Listeria virus A511, which is also virulent. Both belong morphologically to the Herelleviridae family. Further phenotypic observations also correlate well, showing significant nucleotide homologies between them. There are also some shared sequences with other Herelleviridae phages that infect Gram-Positive bacteria.
