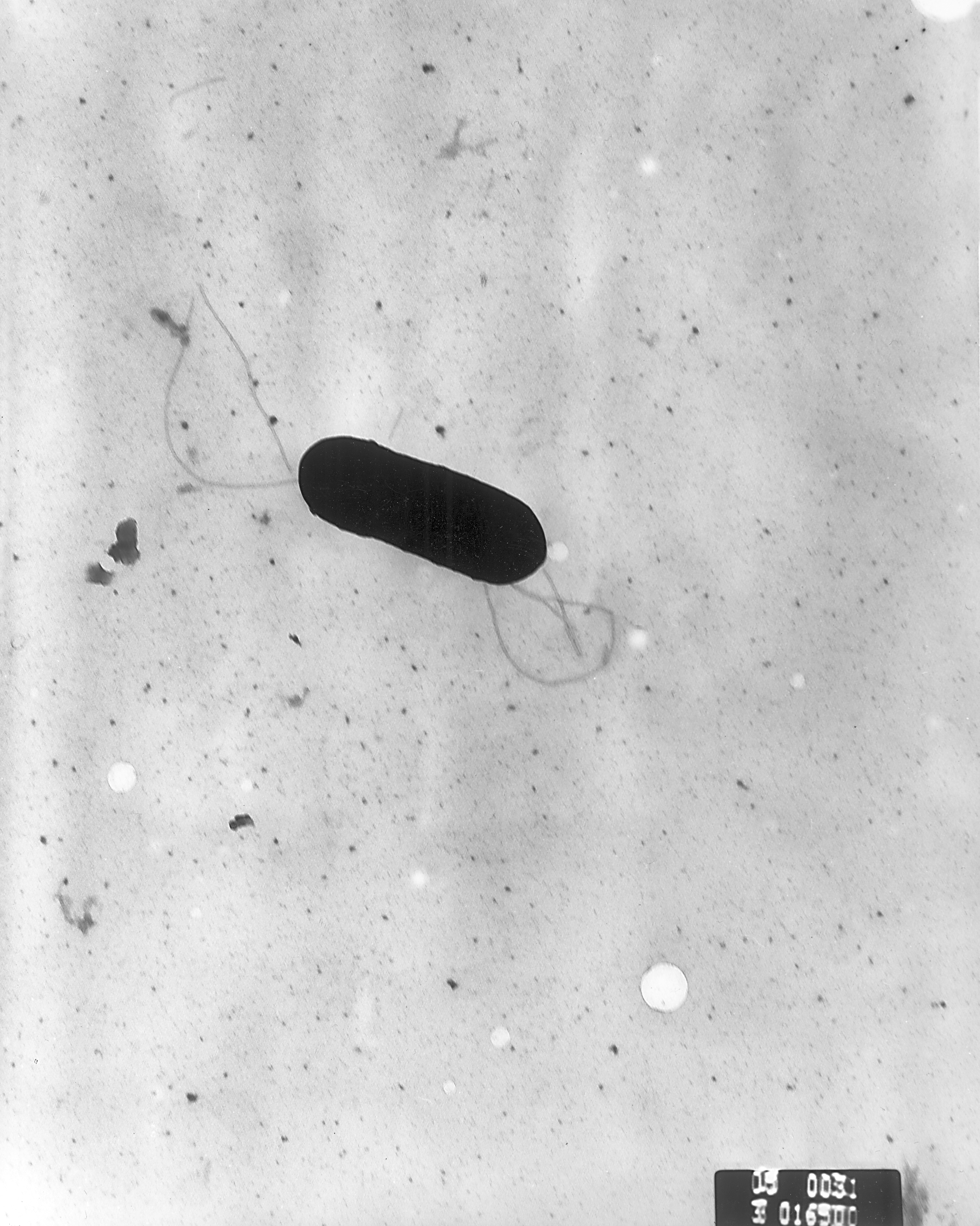
- Scanning electron micrograph of Listeria monocytogenes.

Scientific classification
- Domain: Bacteria
- Kingdom: Bacillati
- Phylum: Bacillota
- Class: Bacilli
- Order: Caryophanales
- Family: Listeriaceae
- Genus: Listeria
- Species: L. monocytogenes

Binomial name
- Listeria monocytogenes (E. Murray et al. 1926) Pirie 1940

= Listeria monocytogenes =

Species of pathogenic bacteria that causes the infection listeriosis

Listeria monocytogenes is the species of pathogenic bacteria that causes the infection listeriosis. It is a facultative anaerobic bacterium, capable of surviving with or without oxygen. It can grow and reproduce inside the host's cells and is one of the most virulent foodborne pathogens. Twenty to thirty percent of foodborne listeriosis infections in high-risk individuals may be fatal. In the European Union, listeriosis continues an upward trend that began in 2008, causing 2,161 confirmed cases and 210 reported deaths in 2014, 16% more than in 2013. In the EU, listeriosis mortality rates also are higher than those of other foodborne pathogens. Responsible for an estimated 1,600 illnesses and 260 deaths in the United States annually, listeriosis ranks third in total number of deaths among foodborne bacterial pathogens, with fatality rates exceeding even the infamous Clostridium botulinum.

Named for Joseph Lister, Listeria monocytogenes is a Gram-positive bacterium, in the phylum Bacillota. Its ability to grow at temperatures as low as 0 °C permits multiplication at typical refrigeration temperatures, greatly increasing its ability to evade control in human foodstuffs. Motile via flagella at 30 °C and below, but usually not at 37 °C, L. monocytogenes can instead move within eukaryotic cells by explosive polymerization of actin filaments (known as comet tails or actin rockets). Once Listeria monocytogenes enters the host cytoplasm, multiple changes in bacterial metabolism and gene expression help to complete its metamorphosis from soil dweller to intracellular pathogen.

Studies suggest that up to 10% of human gastrointestinal tracts may be colonized by L. monocytogenes. Nevertheless, clinical diseases due to L. monocytogenes are more frequently recognized by veterinarians, especially as meningoencephalitis in ruminants. See: listeriosis in animals.

Due to its frequent pathogenicity, causing meningitis in newborns (acquired transvaginally), pregnant women are often advised not to eat soft cheeses such as Brie, Camembert, feta, and queso blanco fresco, which may be contaminated with and permit growth of L. monocytogenes. It is the third most common cause of meningitis in newborns. Listeria monocytogenes can infect the brain, spinal-cord membranes and bloodstream of the host through the ingestion of contaminated food such as unpasteurized dairy or raw foods.

== Classification ==
L. monocytogenes is a Gram-positive, non-spore-forming, motile, facultatively anaerobic, rod-shaped bacterium. It is catalase-positive and oxidase-negative, and expresses a beta hemolysin, which causes destruction of red blood cells. This bacterium exhibits characteristic tumbling motility when viewed with light microscopy. Although L. monocytogenes is actively motile by means of peritrichous flagella at room temperature (20−25 °C), the organism does not synthesize flagella at body temperatures (37 °C).

The genus Listeria belongs to the class Bacilli and the order Bacillales, which also includes Bacillus and Staphylococcus. Listeria currently contains 27 species: Listeria aquatica, Listeria booriae, Listeria cornellensis, Listeria cossartiae, Listeria costaricensis, Listeria farberi, Listeria fleischmannii, Listeria floridensis, Listeria goaensis, Listeria grandensis, Listeria grayi, Listeria immobilis, Listeria innocua, Listeria ivanovii, Listeria marthii, Listeria monocytogenes, Listeria murrayi, Listeria newyorkensis, Listeria portnoyi, Listeria riparia, Listeria rocourtiae, Listeria rustica, Listeria seeligeri, Listeria thailandensis, Listeria valentina, Listeria weihenstephanensis, Listeria welshimeri. L. denitrificans, previously thought to be part of the genus Listeria, was reclassified into the new genus Jonesia. Both L. ivanovii and L. monocytogenes are pathogenic in mice, but only L. monocytogenes is consistently associated with human illness. The 13 serotypes of L. monocytogenes can cause disease, but more than 90% of human isolates belong to only three serotypes: 1/2a, 1/2b, and 4b. L. monocytogenes serotype 4b strains are responsible for 33 to 35% of sporadic human cases worldwide and for all major foodborne outbreaks in Europe and North America since the 1980s.

== History ==
L. monocytogenes was first described by E.G.D. Murray (Everitt George Dunne Murray) in 1924 based on six cases of sudden death in young rabbits, and published a description with his colleagues in 1926 . Murray referred to the organism as Bacterium monocytogenes before Harvey Pirie changed the genus name to Listeria in 1940. Although clinical descriptions of L. monocytogenes infection in both animals and humans were published in the 1920s, it was not recognized as a significant cause of neonatal infection, sepsis, and meningitis until 1952 in East Germany. Listeriosis in adults was later associated with patients living with compromised immune systems, such as individuals taking immunosuppressant drugs and corticosteroids for malignancies or organ transplants, and those with HIV infection.

L. monocytogenes was not identified as a cause of foodborne illness until 1981, however. An outbreak of listeriosis in the Maritime provinces of Canada, involving 41 cases and 18 deaths, mostly in pregnant women and neonates, was epidemiologically linked to the consumption of coleslaw containing cabbage that had been contaminated with L. monocytogenes-contaminated sheep manure. Since then, a number of cases of foodborne listeriosis have been reported, and L. monocytogenes is now widely recognized as an important hazard in the food industry.

== Pathogenesis ==
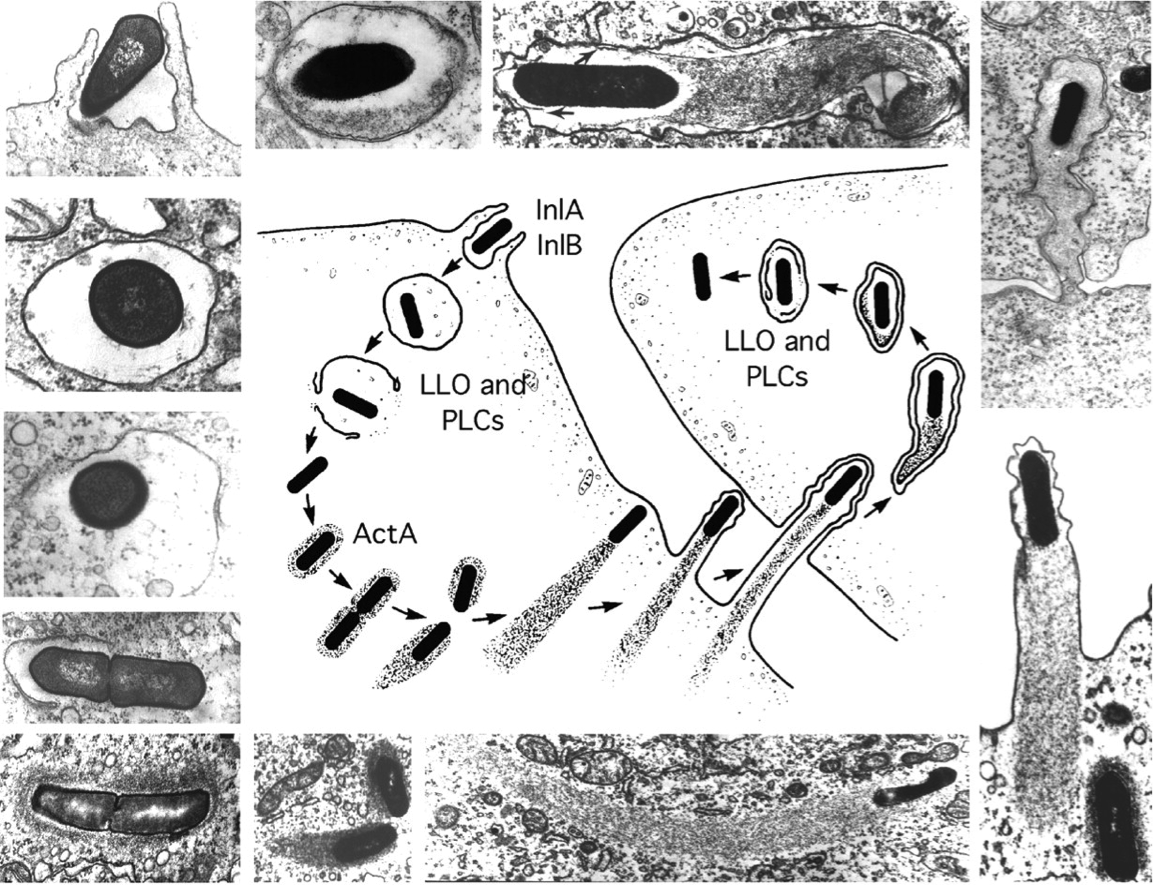
Stages in the intracellular lifecycle of L. monocytogenes: (Center) Cartoon depicting entry, escape from a vacuole, actin nucleation, actin-based motility, and cell-to-cell spread. (Outside) Representative electron micrographs from which the cartoon was derived. LLO, PLCs, and ActA are all described in the text. The cartoon and micrographs were adapted from Tilney and Portnoy (1989).

Invasive infection by L. monocytogenes causes the disease listeriosis. When the infection is not invasive, any illness as a consequence of infection is termed febrile gastroenteritis. The manifestations of listeriosis include sepsis, meningitis (or meningoencephalitis), encephalitis, corneal ulcer, pneumonia, myocarditis, and intrauterine or cervical infections in pregnant women, which may result in spontaneous abortion (second to third trimester) or stillbirth. Surviving neonates of fetomaternal listeriosis may suffer granulomatosis infantiseptica — pyogenic granulomas distributed over the whole body — and may suffer from physical retardation. Influenza-like symptoms, including persistent fever, usually precede the onset of the aforementioned disorders. Gastrointestinal symptoms, such as nausea, vomiting, and diarrhea, may precede more serious forms of listeriosis or may be the only symptoms expressed. Gastrointestinal symptoms were epidemiologically associated with use of antacids or cimetidine. The onset time to serious forms of listeriosis is unknown, but may range from a few days to 3 weeks. The onset time to gastrointestinal symptoms is unknown, but probably exceeds 12 hours. An early study suggested that L. monocytogenes is unique among Gram-positive bacteria in that it might possess lipopolysaccharide, which serves as an endotoxin. Later, it was found to not be a true endotoxin. Listeria cell walls consistently contain lipoteichoic acids, in which a glycolipid moiety, such as a galactosyl-glucosyl-diglyceride, is covalently linked to the terminal phosphomonoester of the teichoic acid. This lipid region anchors the polymer chain to the cytoplasmic membrane. These lipoteichoic acids resemble the lipopolysaccharides of Gram-negative bacteria in both structure and function, being the only amphipathic polymers at the cell surface.

Virulent strains of L. monocytogenes have D-galactose residues on their surface that can attach to D-galactose receptors on the host cell membrane, and modification of teichoic acids with galactose may also assist in localization of internalin B to the bacterial cell surface. These host cells are generally M cells and Peyer's patches of the intestinal mucosa. Once attached to these cells, L. monocytogenes can translocate past the intestinal membrane and into the body. Alternatively, losses of structural integrity (such as small lacerations) in the gastrointestinal epithelium could allow the microorganism to penetrate from the gastrointestinal tract to the bloodstream.

The infectious dose of L. monocytogenes varies with the strain and with the susceptibility of the victim. From cases contracted through raw or supposedly pasteurized milk, one may safely assume that, in susceptible persons, fewer than 1,000 total organisms may cause disease. L. monocytogenes may invade the gastrointestinal epithelium. Once the bacterium enters the host's monocytes, macrophages, or polymorphonuclear leukocytes, it becomes bloodborne (sepsis) and can grow. Its presence intracellularly in phagocytic cells also permits access to the brain and probably transplacental migration to the fetus in pregnant women. This process is known as the "Trojan Horse mechanism". The pathogenesis of L. monocytogenes centers on its ability to survive and multiply in phagocytic host cells. It seems that Listeria originally evolved to invade membranes of the intestines, as an intracellular infection, and developed a chemical mechanism to do so. This involves a bacterial protein internalin (InlA/InlB), which attaches to a protein on the intestinal cell membrane "cadherin" and allows the bacteria to invade the cells through a zipper mechanism. These adhesion molecules are also to be found in two other unusually tough barriers in humans — the blood-brain barrier and the fetal–placental barrier, and this may explain the apparent affinity that L. monocytogenes has for causing meningitis and affecting babies in utero. Once inside the cell, L. monocytogenes rapidly acidifies the lumen of the vacuole formed around it during cell entry to activate listeriolysin O, a cholesterol-dependent cytolysin capable of disrupting the vacuolar membrane. This frees the pathogen and gives it access to the cytosol of the cell, where it continues its pathogenesis. Motility in the intracellular space is provided by actin assembly-inducing protein, which allows the bacteria to use the host cell's actin polymerization machinery to polymerize the cytoskeleton to give a "boost" to the bacterial cell so it can move in the cell. The same mechanism also allows the bacteria to travel from cell to cell.

=== Regulation of pathogenesis ===
L. monocytogenes can act as a saprophyte or a pathogen, depending on its environment. When this bacterium is present within a host organism, quorum sensing and other signals cause the up-regulation of several virulence genes. Depending on the location of the bacterium within the host organism, different activators up-regulate the virulence genes. Recent studies have shown that host-derived stress signals play an important role in coordinating virulence activation. A multi-protein signaling complex known as the stressosome senses environmental stress and activates the alternative sigma factor σB, which in turn promotes transcription of prfA from the stress-responsive P2 promoter. This regulatory pathway links stress sensing to activation of the PrfA-controlled virulence program.

SigB, an alternative sigma factor, up-regulates Vir genes in the intestines, whereas PrfA up-regulates gene expression when the bacterium is present in blood. L. monocytogenes also senses the entry to host by examining available nutrient sources. For example L-glutamine, an abundant nitrogen source in the host, induces the expression of virulence genes in L. monocytogenes. Little is known about how this bacterium switches between acting as a saprophyte and a pathogen; however, several noncoding RNAs are thought to be required to induce this change.

Experimental studies using a ΔP1 strain, in which prfA expression depends mainly on the σB-dependent P2 promoter, demonstrated that disruption of σB or stressosome components strongly reduces prfA transcription and PrfA protein levels. Mutations in the stressosome also lead to heterogeneous virulence phenotypes within genetically identical bacterial populations, observed as mixed-size plaques in fibroblast infection assays. This indicates that stress-dependent signaling is required to ensure coordinated activation of virulence across the bacterial population.Importantly, constitutive activation of PrfA alone does not restore homogeneous virulence in stressosome mutants, suggesting that proper timing and transcriptional regulation of prfA during infection are critical. These findings support a model in which stress sensing through the stressosome-σB pathway ensures robust and population-level activation of virulence genes during intracellular infection.

=== Pathogenicity of lineages ===
L. monocytogenes has three distinct lineages, with differing evolutionary histories and pathogenic potentials. Lineage I strains contain the majority of human clinical isolates and all human epidemic clones, but are underrepresented in animal clinical isolates. Lineage II strains are overrepresented in animal cases and underrepresented in human clinical cases, and are more prevalent in environmental and food samples. Lineage III isolates are very rare, but significantly more common in animal than human isolates.

== Detection ==
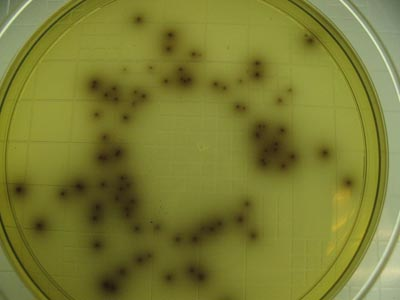
Colonies of typical L. monocytogenes as they appear when grown on Listeria-selective agar

The Anton test is used in the identification of L. monocytogenes; instillation of a culture into the conjunctival sac of a rabbit or guinea pig causes severe keratoconjunctivitis within 24 hours.

Listeria species grow on media such as Mueller-Hinton agar. Identification is enhanced if the primary cultures are done on agar containing sheep blood, because the characteristic small zone of hemolysis can be observed around and under colonies. Isolation can be enhanced if the tissue is kept at 4 °C for some days before inoculation into bacteriologic media. The organism is a facultative anaerobe and is catalase-positive and motile. Listeria produces acid, but not gas, when fermenting a variety of carbohydrates. The motility at room temperature and hemolysin production are primary findings that help differentiate Listeria from Corynebacterium.

The methods for analysis of food are complex and time-consuming. The present U.S. FDA method, revised in September 1990, requires 24 and 48 hours of enrichment, followed by a variety of other tests. Total time to identification takes five to seven days, but the announcement of specific non-radiolabelled DNA probes should soon allow a simpler and faster confirmation of suspect isolates.

Recombinant DNA technology may even permit two- to three-day positive analysis in the future. Currently, the FDA is collaborating in adapting its methodology to quantitate very low numbers of the organisms in foods.

== Treatment ==
When listeric meningitis occurs, the overall mortality may reach 70%, from sepsis 50%, and from perinatal/neonatal infections greater than 80%. In infections during pregnancy, the mother usually survives. Reports of successful treatment with parenteral penicillin or ampicillin exist. Trimethoprim-sulfamethoxazole has been shown effective in patients allergic to penicillin.

A bacteriophage, Listeria phage P100, has been proposed as food additive to control L. monocytogenes. Bacteriophage treatments have been developed by several companies. EBI Food Safety and Intralytix both have products suitable for treatment of the bacterium. The U.S. Food and Drug Administration (FDA) approved a cocktail of six bacteriophages from Intralytix, and a one-type phage product from EBI Food Safety designed to kill L. monocytogenes. Uses would potentially include spraying it on fruits and ready-to-eat meat such as sliced ham and turkey.

Helminthic therapy may provide protection against Listeria monocytogenes by stimulating virtual memory T cells and against induced sepsis.

== Use as a transfection vector ==
Because L. monocytogenes is an intracellular bacterium, some studies have used this bacterium as a vector to deliver genes in vitro. Current transfection efficiency remains poor. One example of the successful use of L. monocytogenes in in vitro transfer technologies is in the delivery of gene therapies for cystic fibrosis cases.

=== Cancer treatment ===
Listeria monocytogenes is being investigated as a cancer immunotherapy for several types of cancer.

A live attenuated Listeria monocytogenes cancer vaccine, ADXS11-001, is under development as a possible treatment for cervical carcinoma.

== Epidemiology ==
Researchers have found Listeria monocytogenes in at least 37 mammalian species, both domesticated and feral, as well as in at least 17 species of birds and possibly in some species of fish and shellfish. Laboratories can isolate Listeria monocytogenes from soil, silage, and other environmental sources. Listeria monocytogenes is quite hardy and resists the deleterious effects of freezing, drying, and heat remarkably well for a bacterium that does not form spores. Most Listeria monocytogenes strains are pathogenic to some degree.

== Routes of infection ==
Listeria monocytogenes has been associated with such foods as raw milk, pasteurized fluid milk, cheeses (particularly soft-ripened varieties), hard-boiled eggs, ice cream, raw vegetables, fermented raw-meat sausages, raw and cooked poultry, raw meats (of all types), and raw and smoked fish. Most bacteria can survive near freezing temperatures, but cannot absorb nutrients, grow or replicate; however, L. monocytogenes has the ability to grow at temperatures as low as 0 °C which permits exponential multiplication in refrigerated foods. At refrigeration temperature, such as 4 °C, the amount of ferric iron can affect the growth of L. monocytogenes.

== Infectious cycle ==
The primary site of infection is the intestinal epithelium, where the bacteria invade nonphagocytic cells via the "zipper" mechanism. Uptake is stimulated by the binding of listerial internalins (Inl) to E-cadherin, a host cell adhesion factor, or Met (c-Met), hepatocyte growth factor. This binding activates certain Rho-GTPases, which subsequently bind and stabilize Wiskott–Aldrich syndrome protein (WASp). WASp can then bind the Arp2/3 complex and serve as an actin nucleation point. Subsequent actin polymerization creates a "phagocytic cup", an actin-based structure normally formed around foreign materials by phagocytes prior to endocytosis. The net effect of internalin binding is to exploit the junction-forming apparatus of the host into internalizing the bacterium. L. monocytogenes can also invade phagocytic cells (e.g., macrophages), but requires only internalins for invasion of nonphagocytic cells.

Following internalization, the bacterium must escape from the vacuole/phagosome before fusion with a lysosome can occur. Three main virulence factors that allow the bacterium to escape are listeriolysin O (LLO encoded by hly) phospholipase A (encoded by plcA) and phospholipase B (plcB). Secretion of LLO and PlcA disrupts the vacuolar membrane and allows the bacterium to escape into the cytoplasm, where it may proliferate.

Once in the cytoplasm, L. monocytogenes exploits host actin for the second time. ActA proteins associated with the old bacterial cell pole (being a bacillus, L. monocytogenes septates in the middle of the cell, thus has one new pole and one old pole) are capable of binding the Arp2/3 complex, thereby inducing actin nucleation at a specific area of the bacterial cell surface. Actin polymerization then propels the bacterium unidirectionally into the host cell membrane. The protrusion formed may then be internalized by a neighboring cell, forming a double-membrane vacuole from which the bacterium must escape using LLO and PlcB. This mode of direct cell-to-cell spread involves a cellular mechanism known as paracytophagy.

The ability of L. monocytogenes to successfully infect depends on its resistance to the high concentrations of bile encountered throughout the gastrointestinal tract. This resistance is due, in part, to the nucleotide excision repair protein UvrA that is necessary for repair of DNA damages caused by bile salts.
