= List of restriction enzyme cutting sites: T–Z =

Legend of nucleobases
Code	Nucleotide represented
A	Adenine (A)
C	Cytosine (C)
G	Guanine (G)
T	Thymine (T)
N	A, C, G or T
M	A or C
R	A or G
W	A or T
Y	C or T
S	C or G
K	G or T
H	A, C or T
B	C, G or T
V	A, C or G
D	A, G or T

This article contains a list of the most studied restriction enzymes whose names start with T to Z inclusive. It contains approximately 70 enzymes.

The following information is given:

- Enzyme: Accepted name of the molecule, according to the internationally adopted nomenclature, and bibliographical references. (Further reading: see the section "Nomenclature" in the article "Restriction enzyme".)
- PDB code: Code used to identify the structure of a protein in the PDB database of protein structures. The 3D atomic structure of a protein provides highly valuable information to understand the intimate details of its mechanism of action.
- Source: Organism that naturally produces the enzyme.
- Recognition sequence: Sequence of DNA recognized by the enzyme and to which it specifically binds.
- Cut: Cutting site and DNA products of the cut. The recognition sequence and the cutting site usually match, but sometimes the cutting site can be dozens of nucleotides away from the recognition site.
- Isoschizomers and neoschizomers: An isoschizomer is an enzyme that recognizes the same sequence as another. A neoschizomer is a special type of isoschizomer that recognizes the same sequence as another, but cuts in a different manner. A maximum number of 8-10 most common isoschizomers are indicated for every enzyme but there may be many more. Neoschizomers are shown in bold and green color font (e.g.: **BamHI**). When "None on date" is indicated, that means that there were no registered isoschizomers in the databases on that date with a clearly defined cutting site. Isoschizomers indicated in white font and grey background correspond to enzymes not listed in the current lists:

as in this not listed enzyme:	EcoR70I

== Restriction enzymes ==
=== T ===
**Enzyme**	**PDB code**	Source	**Recognition sequence**	**Cut**	**Isoschizomers**
TaaI		Thermus aquaticus Vn 4-311	5' ACNGT; 3' TGNCA	5' ---ACN GT--- 3'; 3' ---TG NCA--- 5'
TaiI		Thermus aquaticus cs1-331	5' ACGT; 3' TGCA	5' ---ACGT --- 3'; 3' --- TGCA--- 5'
TaqI		Thermus aquaticus	5' TCGA; 3' AGCT	5' ---T CGA--- 3'; 3' ---AGC T--- 5'
TaqII		Thermus aquaticus YTI	5' GACCGA; 3' CTGGCT	5' ---GACCGAN_{8}NNN --- 3'; 3' ---CTGGCTN_{8}N NN--- 5'
Taq52I		Thermus aquaticus YS52	5' GCWGC; 3' CGWCG	5' ---G CWGC--- 3'; 3' ---CGWC G--- 5'	AceI, ApeKI, SuiI, TseI
TaqXI		Thermus aquaticus	5' CCWGG; 3' GGWCC	5' ---CC WGG--- 3'; 3' ---GGW CC--- 5'	ApaORI, BseBI, BsiLI, BstNI, BstOI, Bst2UI, MvaI, **SleI**, **SspAI**
TasI		Thermus aquaticus Vn 4-211	5' AATT; 3' TTAA	5' --- AATT--- 3'; 3' ---TTAA --- 5'
TatI		Thermus aquaticus CBA1-331	5' WGTACW; 3' WCATGW	5' ---W GTACW--- 3'; 3' ---WCATG W--- 5'
TauI		Thermus aquaticus	5' GCSGC; 3' CGSCG	5' ---GCSG C--- 3'; 3' ---C GSCG--- 5'
TelI		Tolypothrix elabens	5' GACNNNGTC; 3' CTGNNNCAG	5' ---GACN NNGTC--- 3'; 3' ---CTGNN NCAG--- 5'	AspI, AtsI, PflFI, PsyI, Tth111I
TfiI		Thermus filiformis	5' GAWTC; 3' CTWAG	5' ---G AWTC--- 3'; 3' ---CTWA G--- 5'
ThaI		Thermoplasma acidophilum	5' CGCG; 3' GCGC	5' ---CG CG--- 3'; 3' ---GC GC--- 5'	Bpu95I, Bsh1236I, Bsp50I, BstFNI, BstUI, Csp68KVI, FalII, FnuDII
TliI		Thermococcus litoralis	5' CTCGAG; 3' GAGCTC	5' ---C TCGAG--- 3'; 3' ---GAGCT C--- 5'	AbrI, BluI, BssHI, MavI, Sau3239I, Sfr274I, StrI, XhoI
Tru1I		Thermus ruber RFL1	5' TTAA; 3' AATT	5' ---T TAA--- 3'; 3' ---AAT T--- 5'
Tru9I		Thermus ruber 9	5' TTAA; 3' AATT	5' ---T TAA--- 3'; 3' ---AAT T--- 5'
Tru201I		Thermus ruber 201	5' RGATCY; 3' YCTAGR	5' ---R GATCY--- 3'; 3' ---YCTAG R--- 5'
TscI		Thermus sp. 491A	5' ACGT; 3' TGCA	5' ---ACGT --- 3'; 3' --- TGCA--- 5'
TseI		Thermus sp. 93170	5' GCWGC; 3' CGWCG	5' ---G CWGC--- 3'; 3' ---CGWC G--- 5'	AceI, ApeKI, SuiI, Taq52I
Tsp1I		Thermus sp. 1	5' ACTGG; 3' TGACC	5' ---ACTGGN --- 3'; 3' ---TGAC CN--- 5'
Tsp32I		Thermus sp. 32	5' TCGA; 3' AGCT	5' ---T CGA--- 3'; 3' ---AGC T--- 5'
Tsp32II		Thermus sp. 32	5' TCGA; 3' AGCT	5' ---T CGA--- 3'; 3' ---AGC T--- 5'
Tsp45I		Thermus sp. YS45	5' GTSAC; 3' CASTG	5' --- GTSAC--- 3'; 3' ---CASTG --- 5'
Tsp49I		Thermus sp.	5' ACGT; 3' TGCA	5' ---ACGT --- 3'; 3' --- TGCA--- 5'
Tsp509I		Thermus sp.	5' AATT; 3' TTAA	5' --- AATT--- 3'; 3' ---TTAA --- 5'
TspBI		Thermophilic sp.	5' CCRYGG; 3' GGYRCC	5' ---C CRYGG--- 3'; 3' ---GGYRC C--- 5'
Tsp4CI		Thermus sp. 4C	5' ACNGT; 3' TGNCA	5' ---ACN GT--- 3'; 3' ---TG NCA--- 5'
TspDTI		Thermus sp. DT	5' ATGAA; 3' TACTT	5' ---ATGAAN_{8}NNN --- 3'; 3' ---TACTTN_{8}N NN--- 5'	— None in May 2010 —
TspEI		Thermus sp. 1E	5' AATT; 3' TTAA	5' --- AATT--- 3'; 3' ---TTAA --- 5'
Tsp8EI		Thermus sp. 8E	5' GCCN_{5}GGC; 3' CGGN_{5}CCG	5' ---GCCNNNN NGGC--- 3'; 3' ---CGGN NNNNCCG--- 5'
TspGWI		Thermus sp. GW	5' ACGGA; 3' TGCCT	5' ---ACGGAN_{8}NNN --- 3'; 3' ---TGCCTN_{8}N NN--- 5'
TspMI = UthSI		Unidentified thermophile	5' CCCGGG; 3' GGGCCC	5' ---C CCGGG--- 3'; 3' ---GGGCC C--- 5'	AhyI, Cfr9I, EaeAI, EclRI, **PaeBI**, PspAI, **SmaI**, XcyI, XmaI, XmaCI
TspRI		Thermus sp. R	5' CASTGNN; 3' GTSAC	5' ---CASTGNN --- 3'; 3' --- GTSACNN--- 5'
Tth111I		Thermus thermophilus 111	5' GACNNNGTC; 3' CTGNNNCAG	5' ---GACN NNGTC--- 3'; 3' ---CTGNN NCAG--- 5'	AspI, AtsI, PflFI, PsyI, TelI
Tth111II		Thermus thermophilus 111	5' CAARCA; 3' GTTYGT	5' ---CAARCAN_{8}NNN --- 3'; 3' ---GTTYGTN_{8}N NN--- 5'
TthHB8I		Thermus thermophilus HB8	5' TCGA; 3' AGCT	5' ---T CGA--- 3'; 3' ---AGC T--- 5'

=== U ===
**Enzyme**	**PDB code**	Source	**Recognition sequence**	**Cut**	**Isoschizomers**
Uba4009I		Unidentified bacterium A	5' GGATCC; 3' CCTAGG	5' ---G GATCC--- 3'; 3' ---CCTAG G--- 5'	AccEBI, AliI, ApaCI, AsiI, BamHI, BnaI, BspAAIII, RspLKII, SolI
Uba153AI		Unidentified bacterium 153A	5' CAGCTG; 3' GTCGAC	5' ---CAG CTG--- 3'; 3' ---GTC GAC--- 5'
UbaM39I		Unidentified bacterium M39	5' CAGCTG; 3' GTCGAC	5' ---CAG CTG--- 3'; 3' ---GTC GAC--- 5'
UnbI		Unidentified bacterium #8	5' GGNCC; 3' CCNGG	5' --- GGNCC--- 3'; 3' ---CCNGG --- 5'	**AvcI**, **BavAII**, **Bce22I**, **Bsp1894I**, **Bsu54I**, **FmuI**, **NspIV**, **UnbI**
Uur960I		Ureaplasma urealyticum 960	5' GCNGC; 3' CGNCG	5' ---GC NGC--- 3'; 3' ---CGN CG--- 5'

=== V ===
**Enzyme**	**PDB code**	Source	**Recognition sequence**	**Cut**	**Isoschizomers**
Van91I		Vibrio anguillarum RFL91	5' CCAN_{5}TGG; 3' GGTN_{5}ACC	5' ---CCANNNN NTGG--- 3'; 3' ---GGTN NNNNACC--- 5'	AccB7I, AcpII, Asp10HII, BasI, Esp1396I, PflBI, PflMI
Vha464I		Vibrio harveyi 464	5' CTTAAG; 3' GAATTC	5' ---C TTAAG--- 3'; 3' ---GAATT C--- 5'
VneI		Vibrio nereis 18	5' GTGCAC; 3' CACGTG	5' ---G TGCAC--- 3'; 3' ---CACGT G--- 5'	Alw44I, ApaLI, SnoI
VpaK32I		Vibrio parahaemolyticus 4387-61	5' GCTCTTC; 3' CGAGAAG	5' ---GCTCTTCN NNN--- 3'; 3' ---CGAGAAGNNNN --- 5'
VpaK11AI		Vibrio parahaemolyticus 1743	5' GGWCC; 3' CCWGG	5' --- GGWCC--- 3'; 3' ---CCWGG --- 5'	**Bme216I**, **CauI**, **EagMI**, **FdiI**, **HgiBI**, **HgiHIII**, **SinI**, **VpaK11BI**
VpaK11BI		Vibrio parahaemolyticus 1743-1	5' GGWCC; 3' CCWGG	5' ---G GWCC--- 3'; 3' ---CCWG G--- 5'	BsrAI, CauI, EagMI, FdiI, HgiBI, HgiJI, SinI, **VpaK11AI**
VspI		Vibrio sp. 343	5' ATTAAT; 3' TAATTA	5' ---AT TAAT--- 3'; 3' ---TAAT TA--- 5'	AseI, AsnI, BpoAI, PshBI, Sru4DI

=== X ===
**Enzyme**	**PDB code**	Source	**Recognition sequence**	**Cut**	**Isoschizomers**
XagI		Xanthobacter agilis Vs 18-132	5' CCTN_{5}AGG; 3' GGAN_{5}TCC	5' ---CCTNN NNNAGG--- 3'; 3' ---GGANNN NNTCC--- 5'
XapI		Xanthomonas ampelina Slo 51-021	5' RAATTY; 3' YTTAAR	5' ---R AATTY--- 3'; 3' ---YTTAA R--- 5'	AcsI, ApoI, / CfaI, / FsiI
XbaI		Xanthomonas badrii	5' TCTAGA; 3' AGATCT	5' ---T CTAGA--- 3'; 3' ---AGATC T--- 5'
XcaI		Xanthomonas campestris	5' GTATAC; 3' CATATG	5' ---GTA TAC--- 3'; 3' ---CAT ATG--- 5'
XceI		Xanthomonas campestris Ast 40-024	5' RCATGY; 3' YGTACR	5' ---RCATG Y--- 3'; 3' ---Y GTACR--- 5'
XciI		Xanthomonas citri	5' GTCGAC; 3' CAGCTG	5' ---G TCGAC--- 3'; 3' ---CAGCT G--- 5'
XcmI		Xanthomonas campestris	5' CCAN_{9}TGG; 3' GGTN_{9}ACC	5' ---CCANNNNN NNNNTGG--- 3'; 3' ---GGTNNNN NNNNNACC--- 5'
XcyI		Xanthomonas cyanopsidis 13D5	5' CCCGGG; 3' GGGCCC	5' ---C CCGGG--- 3'; 3' ---GGGCC C--- 5'	**CfrJ4I**, EaeAI, EclRI, Pac25I, PspAI, TspMI, XmaI, XmaCI
XhoI		Xanthomonas holcicola	5' CTCGAG; 3' GAGCTC	5' ---C TCGAG--- 3'; 3' ---GAGCT C--- 5'	AbrI, BluI, BssHI, PanI, Sau3239I, Sfr274I, TliI, XpaI
XhoII		Xanthomonas holcicola	5' RGATCY; 3' YCTAGR	5' ---R GATCY--- 3'; 3' ---YCTAG R--- 5'
XmaI		Xanthomonas malvacearum	5' CCCGGG; 3' GGGCCC	5' ---C CCGGG--- 3'; 3' ---GGGCC C--- 5'	AhyI, Cfr9I, EaeAI, EclRI, **PaeBI**, PspAI, TspMI, XcyI, XmaCI
XmaIII		Xanthomonas malvacearum	5' CGGCCG; 3' GCCGGC	5' ---C GGCCG--- 3'; 3' ---GCCGG C--- 5'	AaaI, BseX3I, BstZI, EagI, EclXI, Eco52I, SenPT16I
XmaCI		Xanthomonas malvacearum C	5' CCCGGG; 3' GGGCCC	5' ---C CCGGG--- 3'; 3' ---GGGCC C--- 5'	AhyI, Cfr9I, EaeAI, EclRI, **PaeBI**, Pac25I, PspAI, TspMI, XcyI, XmaI
XmaJI		Xanthomonas maltophilia Jo 85-025	5' CCTAGG; 3' GGATCC	5' ---C CTAGG--- 3'; 3' ---GGATC C--- 5'	AspA2I, AvrII, AvrBII, BlnI, BspA2I
XmiI		Xanthomonas maltophilia Jo 21-021	5' GTMKAC; 3' CAKMTG	5' ---GT MKAC--- 3'; 3' ---CAKM TG--- 5'	AccI, FblI
XmnI		Xanthomonas manihotis 7AS1	5' GAAN_{4}TTC; 3' CTTN_{4}AAG	5' ---GAANN NNTTC--- 3'; 3' ---CTTNN NNAAG--- 5'	Asp700I, BbvAI, MroXI, PdmI
XorII		Xanthomonas oryzae	5' CGATCG; 3' GCTAGC	5' ---CGAT CG--- 3'; 3' ---GC TAGC--- 5'	Afa16RI, BspCI, EagBI, ErhB9I, MvrI, Ple19I, PvuI, RshI
XpaI		Xanthomonas papavericola	5' CTCGAG; 3' GAGCTC	5' ---C TCGAG--- 3'; 3' ---GAGCT C--- 5'	BssHI, MavI, PanI, SauLPII, Sbi68I, Sol10179I, StrI, XhoI
XspI		Xanthomonas sp. YK1	5' CTAG; 3' GATC	5' ---C TAG--- 3'; 3' ---GAT C--- 5'

=== Y ===
**Enzyme**	**PDB code**	Source	**Recognition sequence**	**Cut**	**Isoschizomers**
YenI		Yersinia enterocolitica 08 A2635	5' CTGCAG; 3' GACGTC	5' ---CTGCA G--- 3'; 3' ---G ACGTC--- 5'	Asp713I, BsuBI, CfrA4I, Ecl37kI, Psp23I, PstI, SalPI, SflI, Sst12I

=== Z ===
**Enzyme**	**PDB code**	Source	**Recognition sequence**	**Cut**	**Isoschizomers**
ZanI		Zymomonas anaerobia	5' CCWGG; 3' GGWCC	5' ---CC WGG--- 3'; 3' ---GGW CC--- 5'	ApaORI, BseBI, BspNI, BstNI, Bst2UI, CthII, **EcoRII**, MvaI, **SspAI**
ZhoI		Zymomonas holcicola	5' ATCGAT; 3' TAGCTA	5' ---AT CGAT--- 3'; 3' ---TAGC TA--- 5'	BanIII, BbvAII, BscI, BspJI, ClaI, LcaI, PgaI, SpmI, Ssp27144I
ZraI		Zoogloea ramigera 11	5' GACGTC; 3' CTGCAG	5' ---GAC GTC--- 3'; 3' ---CTG CAG--- 5'	AatII, Ssp5230I
ZrmI		Zoogloea ramigera SCA	5' AGTACT; 3' TCATGA	5' ---AGT ACT--- 3'; 3' ---TCA TGA--- 5'	Acc113I, AssI, / BmcAI, Bpa34I, DpaI, Eco255I, RflFII, ScaI
Zsp2I		Zoogloea sp. 2	5' ATGCAT; 3' TACGTA	5' ---ATGCA T--- 3'; 3' ---T ACGTA--- 5'	BfrBI, Csp68KIII, EcoT22I, NsiI, PinBI, Ppu10I, SepI, SspD5II
