= Adapter (genetics) =

An adapter or adaptor in genetic engineering is a short, chemically synthesized, double-stranded oligonucleotide that can be ligated to the ends of other DNA or RNA molecules. Double stranded adapters are different from linkers in that they contain one blunt end and one sticky end. For instance, a double stranded DNA adapter can be used to link the ends of two other DNA molecules (i.e., ends that do not have "sticky ends", that is complementary protruding single strands by themselves). It may be used to add sticky ends to cDNA allowing it to be ligated into the plasmid much more efficiently. Two adapters could base pair to each other to form dimers.

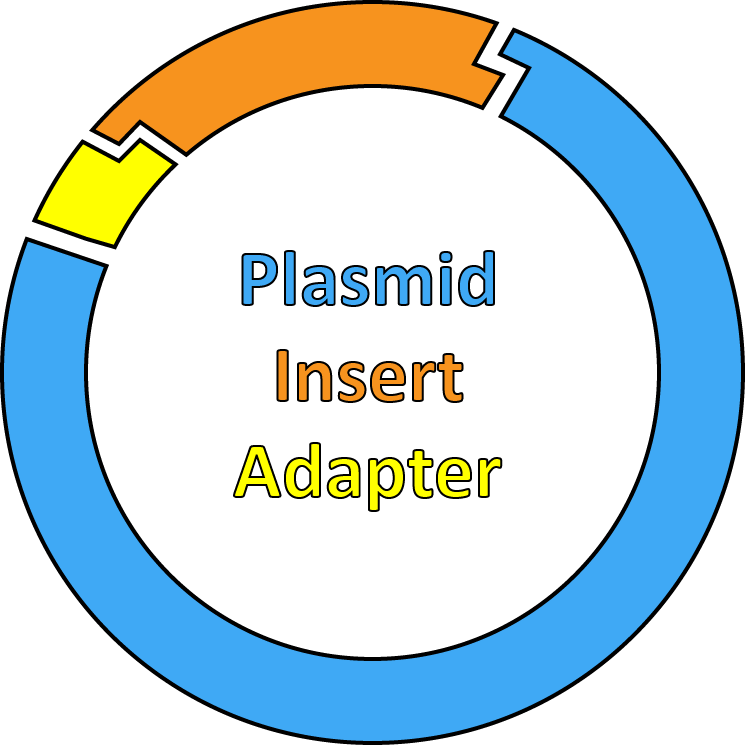
Diagram showing an adapter within a plasmid

== Types of Adapters ==
A conversion adapter is used to join a DNA insert cut with one restriction enzyme, say EcoRl, with a vector opened with another enzyme, Bam Hl. This adapter can be used to convert the cohesive end produced by Bam Hl to one produced by Eco Rl or vice versa. One of its applications is ligating cDNA into a plasmid or other vectors instead of using Terminal deoxynucleotide Transferase enzyme to add poly A to the cDNA fragment.

NGS adapters are short ~80 BP fragments that bind to DNA to aid in amplification during library preparation and are also useful to bind DNA to the flow cell during sequencing. These adapters are made up of three parts that flank the DNA sequence of interest. There is the flow cell binding sequence, the primer binding site, and also tagged barcoded regions to allow pooled sequencing.
