= List of restriction enzyme cutting sites =

A restriction enzyme or restriction endonuclease is a special type of biological macromolecule that functions as part of the "immune system" in bacteria. One special kind of restriction enzymes is the class of "homing endonucleases", these being present in all three domains of life, although their function seems to be very different from one domain to another.

The classical restriction enzymes cut up, and hence render harmless, any unknown (non-cellular) DNA that enters a bacterial cell as a result of a viral infection. They recognize a specific DNA sequence, usually short (3 to 8 bp), and cut it, producing either blunt or overhung ends, either at or nearby the recognition site.

Restriction enzymes are quite variable in the short DNA sequences they recognize. An organism often has several different enzymes, each specific to a distinct short DNA sequence.

== Restriction enzymes catalog ==
The list includes some of the most studied examples of restriction endoncleases. The following information is given:

- Enzyme: Accepted name of the molecule, according to the internationally adopted nomenclature, and bibliographical references. (Further reading: see the section "Nomenclature" in the article "Restriction enzyme".)
- PDB code: Code used to identify the structure of a protein in the PDB database of protein structures. The 3D atomic structure of a protein provides highly valuable information to understand the intimate details of its mechanism of action.
- Source: Organism that naturally produces the enzyme.
- Recognition sequence: Sequence of DNA recognized by the enzyme and to which it specifically binds.
- Cut: Cutting site and DNA products of the cut. The recognition sequence and the cutting site usually match, but sometimes the cutting site can be dozens of nucleotides away from the recognition site.
- Isoschizomers and neoschizomers: An isoschizomer is an enzyme that recognizes the same sequence as another. A neoschizomer is a special type of isoschizomer that recognizes the same sequence as another, but cuts in a different manner. A maximum number of 8-10 most common isoschizomers are indicated for every enzyme but there may be many more. Neoschizomers are shown in bold and green color font (e.g.: **BamHI**). When "None on date" is indicated, that means that there were no registered isoschizomers in the databases on that date with a clearly defined cutting site. Isoschizomers indicated in white font and grey background correspond to enzymes not listed in the current lists:

as in this not listed enzyme:	EcoR70I

The whole list contains more than 1,200 enzymes, but databases register about 4,000. To make a list that is accessible to navigation, this list has been divided into different pages. Each page contains somewhere between 120 and 150 entries. Choose a letter to go to a specific part of the list:

== See also ==
- List of homing endonuclease cutting sites
- Restriction enzyme.
- Isoschizomer.
- Detailed articles about certain restriction enzymes: EcoRI, HindIII, BglII.
- Homing endonuclease.
- Introns and inteins.
- Intragenomic conflict: Homing endonuclease genes.
- I-CreI homing endonuclease.
