= EcoEI R protein C-terminal domain =

EcoEI_R_C

Identifiers
- Symbol: EcoEI_R_C
- Pfam: PF08463
- InterPro: IPR013670
Available protein structures:
- PDB: IPR013670 PF08463 (ECOD; PDBsum)
- AlphaFold: IPR013670; PF08463

In molecular biology, the EcoEI R protein C-terminal domain is a protein domain found at the C-terminus of both the R subunit of type I restriction enzymes and the Res subunit of type III restriction enzymes. The type I enzymes include EcoEI, which recognises 5'-GAGN(7)ATGC-3; the R protein (HsdR) is required for both nuclease and ATPase activity.
