= BsuBI/PstI restriction endonuclease =

BsuBI_PstI_RE

Identifiers
- Symbol: BsuBI_PstI_RE
- Pfam: PF06616
- InterPro: IPR009528
Available protein structures:
- PDB: IPR009528 PF06616 (ECOD; PDBsum)
- AlphaFold: IPR009528; PF06616

In molecular biology, the BsuBI/PstI restriction endonuclease family is a family of type II restriction endonucleases. It includes BsuBI and PstI. The enzymes of the BsuBI restriction/modification (R/M) system recognise the target sequence 5'CTGCAG and are functionally identical with those of the PstI R/M system.
