= Restriction digest =

Deliberate fragmentation of DNA in preparation for analysis

In molecular biology, a restriction digest is a procedure used to prepare DNA for analysis or other processing. It is sometimes termed DNA fragmentation, though this term is used for other procedures as well. In a restriction digest, DNA molecules are cleaved at specific regions of 4-12 nucleotides in length (restriction sites) by use of restriction enzymes which recognize these sequences.

The resulting digested DNA is very often selectively amplified using polymerase chain reaction (PCR), making it more suitable for analytical techniques such as agarose gel electrophoresis, and chromatography. It is used in genetic fingerprinting, plasmid subcloning, and RFLP analysis.

== Restriction site ==
A given restriction enzyme cuts DNA segments within a specific nucleotide sequence, at what is called a restriction site. These recognition sequences are typically four, six, eight, ten, or twelve nucleotides long and generally palindromic (i.e. the same nucleotide sequence in the 5' – 3' direction). Because there are only so many ways to arrange the four nucleotides that compose DNA (Adenine, Thymine, Guanine and Cytosine) into a four- to twelve-nucleotide sequence, recognition sequences tend to occur by chance in any long sequence. Restriction enzymes specific to hundreds of distinct sequences have been identified and synthesized for sale to laboratories, and as a result, several potential "restriction sites" appear in almost any gene or locus of interest on any chromosome. Furthermore, almost all artificial plasmids include a (often entirely synthetic) polylinker (also called "multiple cloning site") that contains dozens of restriction enzyme recognition sequences within a very short segment of DNA. This allows the insertion of almost any specific fragment of DNA into plasmid vectors, which can be efficiently "cloned" by insertion into replicating bacterial cells.

After restriction digest, DNA can then be analysed using agarose gel electrophoresis. In gel electrophoresis, a sample of DNA is first "loaded" onto a slab of agarose gel (literally pipetted into small wells at one end of the slab). The gel is then subjected to an electric field, which draws the negatively charged DNA across it. The molecules travel at different rates (and therefore end up at different distances) depending on their net charge (more highly charged particles travel further), and size (smaller particles travel further). Since none of the four nucleotide bases carry any charge, net charge becomes insignificant and size is the main factor affecting rate of diffusion through the gel. Net charge in DNA is produced by the sugar-phosphate backbone. This is in contrast to proteins, in which there is no "backbone", and net charge is generated by different combinations and numbers of charged amino acids.

== Possible uses ==
Restriction digest is most commonly used as part of the process of the molecular cloning of DNA fragment into a vector (such as a cloning vector or an expression vector). The vector typically contains a multiple cloning site where many restriction site may be found, and a foreign piece of DNA may be inserted into the vector by first cutting the restriction sites in the vector as well the DNA fragment, followed by ligation of the DNA fragment into the vector.

Restriction digests are also necessary for performing any of the following analytical techniques:

- Restriction fragment length polymorphism (RFLP)
- Amplified fragment length polymorphism (AFLP)
- Short tandem repeat polymorphism (STRP)

== Methods for performing restriction digest ==
=== Restriction digest by gel electrophoresis ===
In order to perform restriction digest by gel electrophoresis, one must first acquire a sample of purified plasmid DNA. Digestion is performed with the chosen restriction enzymes. The digestion is then run on an electrophoresis gel, which is typically made of agarose. To ensure proper digestion, add the size sof the fragments in each lane. The sum of the individual fragments should equal the size of the original fragment, and each digest's fragments should also sum up to be the same size as each other.

==== Pitfalls ====
If fragment sizes do not properly add up, there are two likely problems:

- Some of the smaller fragments may have run off the end of the gel. This frequently occurs if the gel is run too long.
- The gel was not dense enough and therefore was unable to resolve fragments close in size. This leads to a lack of separation of fragments which were close in size.

== Various restriction enzymes ==
There are numerous types of restriction enzymes, each of which will cut DNA differently. Most commonly used restriction enzymes are Type II restriction endonuclease (See article on Restriction enzymes for examples). There are some that cut a three base pair sequence while others can cut four, six, and even eight. Each enzyme has distinct properties that determine how efficiently it can cut and under what conditions. Most manufacturers that produce such enzymes will often provide a specific buffer solution that contains the unique mix of cations and other components that aid the enzyme in cutting as efficiently as possible. Different restriction enzymes may also have different optimal temperatures under which they function.

Note that for efficient digest of DNA, the restriction site should not be located at the very end of a DNA fragment. The restriction enzymes may require a minimum number of base pairs between the restriction site and the end of the DNA for the enzyme to work efficiently. This number may vary between enzymes, but for most commonly used restriction enzymes around 6–10 base pair is sufficient.

== See also ==
- Agarose gel electrophoresis
- DNA sequencing
- Genetic fingerprinting
- PCR
- Restriction fragment length polymorphism
