= Star activity =

Star activity is the relaxation or alteration of the specificity of restriction enzyme mediated cleavage of DNA that can occur under reaction conditions that differ significantly from those optimal for the enzyme. The result is typically cleavage at non-canonical recognition sites, or sometimes complete loss of specificity.

Differences which can lead to star include low ionic strength, high pH, and high (> 5% v/v) glycerol concentrations. The latter condition is of particular practical interest, since commercial restriction enzymes are usually supplied in a buffer containing a substantial amount of glycerol (50% v/v is typical), meaning insufficient dilution of the enzyme solution can cause star activity; this problem most often arises during double or multiple digests. Star activity can happen because of presence of Mg^{2+}, as is seen in HindIII, for example. Prolonged reaction time can also result in star activity.

The term star activity was introduced by Mayer who characterized the modified activity in EcoRI.
