= Tomaymycin =

Names
- IUPAC name (6R,6aS,8Z)-8-ethylidene-3-hydroxy-2,6-dimethoxy-6,6a,7,9-tetrahydro-5H-pyrrolo[2,1-c][1,4]benzodiazepin-11-one
- Other names GNF-Pf-1072

Identifiers
CAS Number	35050-55-6
3D model (JSmol)	Interactive image
ChEBI	CHEBI:157681; CHEBI:167318
ChEMBL	ChEMBL580013
ChemSpider	13076951
PubChem CID	12444380
- InChI: InChI=1S/C16H20N2O4/c1-4-9-5-12-15(22-3)17-11-7-13(19)14(21-2)6-10(11)16(20)18(12)8-9/h4,6-7,12,15,17,19H,5,8H2,1-3H3/b9-4-/t12-,15+/m0/s1 Key: UQVNRKBFAXNOGA-OHLDGCSVSA-N
- SMILES: C/C=C\1/C[C@H]2[C@H](NC3=CC(=C(C=C3C(=O)N2C1)OC)O)OC

Properties
Chemical formula	C_{16}H_{20}N_{2}O_{4}
Molar mass	304.346 g·mol^{−1}
- Except where otherwise noted, data are given for materials in their standard state (at 25 °C [77 °F], 100 kPa). Infobox references

Tomaymycin is an antitumor and antibiotic pyrrolobenzodiazepine with the molecular formula C_{16}H_{20}N_{2}O_{4}. Tomaymycin is produced by the bacterium Streptomyces achromogenes.
