= HaeIII =

Enzyme

Type-2 restriction enzyme HaeIII
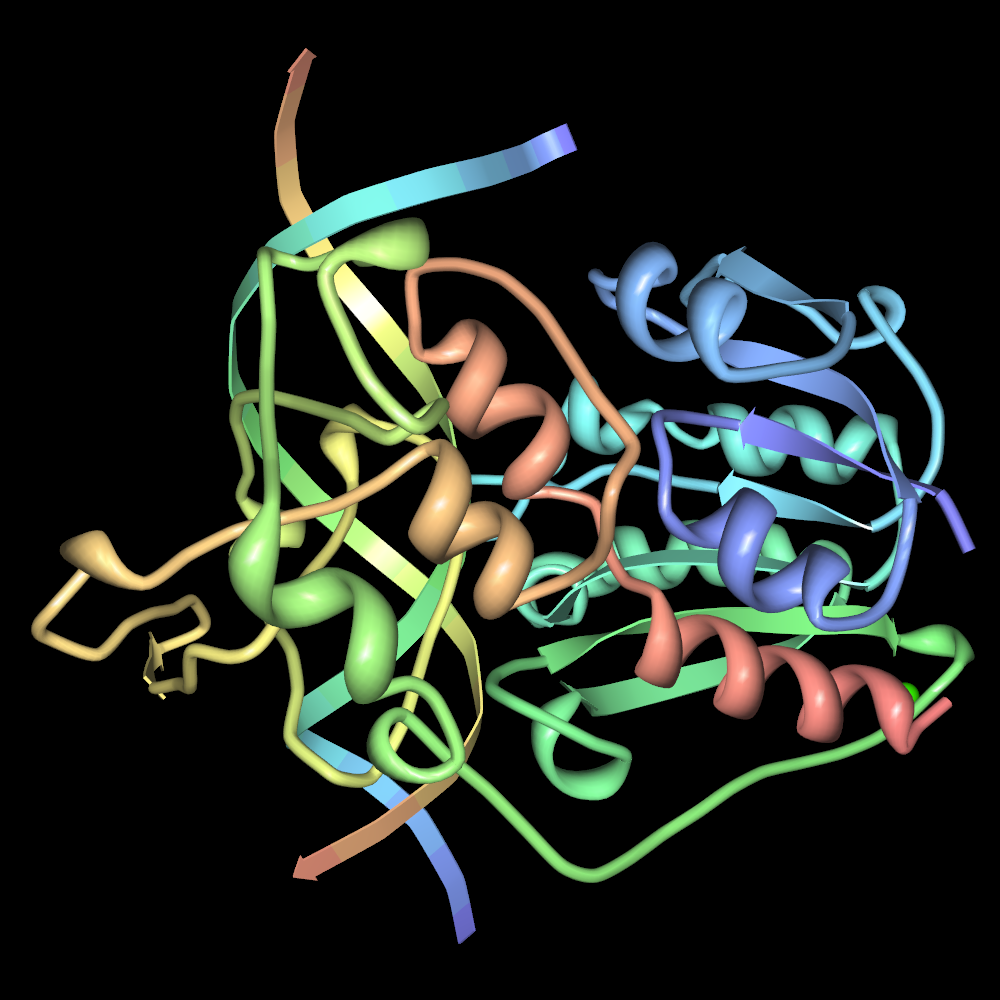
- The crystal structure of HaeIII enzyme convalently complexed to DNA: an extrahelical cytosine and rearranged base pairing.

Identifiers
- Organism: Haemophilus aegyptius
- Symbol: haeIIIR
- Orthologs: OMA: entry
- RefSeq (Prot): WP_006996034.1
- UniProt: O68584

Other data
- EC number: 3.1.21.4
- Chromosome: Genomic: 0.7 - 0.7 Mb
Search for
- Structures: Swiss-model
- Domains: InterPro

HaeIIIR

Identifiers
- Symbol: RE_HaeIII
- Pfam: PF09556
- InterPro: IPR019059
Available protein structures:
- PDB: IPR019059 PF09556 (ECOD; PDBsum)
- AlphaFold: IPR019059; PF09556

HaeIII is one of many restriction enzymes (endonucleases) a type of prokaryotic DNA that protects organisms from unknown, foreign DNA. It is a restriction enzyme used in molecular biology laboratories. It was the third endonuclease to be isolated from the Haemophilus aegyptius bacteria. The enzyme's recognition site—the place where it cuts DNA molecules—is the GGCC nucleotide sequence which means it cleaves DNA at the site 5′-GG/CC-3. The recognition site is usually around 4-8 bps. This enzyme's gene has been sequenced and cloned. This is done to make DNA fragments in blunt ends. HaeIII is not effective for single stranded DNA cleavage.

== Properties ==
HaeIII has a molecular weight of 37126. After a 2-10-fold of HaeIII takes place, there is overdigestion of a DNA substrate. This results in 100% being cut, more than 50% of fragments being ligated, and more than 95% being recut. Heat inactivation comes at about 80 °C for 20 minutes. The locus of the HaeIII enzyme is on AF05137, and is linear with 957 base pairs.

== History ==
HaeIII along with other restriction enzymes were discovered in 1970 by Werner Arber and Matthew Meselson. The HaeIII methyltransferase also known as the MTase gene from Haemophilus aegyptius (recognition sequence: 5′-GGCC-3′) was made into Escherichia coli (E.coli) in the plasmid vector pBR322. The gene was extracted from a single EcoRI fragment and a single HindIII enzyme fragment. Clones carrying additional adjacent fragments were found to code for the HaeIII restriction enzyme.

== Function ==
The enzyme cleaves the DNA at the positions where the GGCC sequence is found. The cleavage occurs between the second and the third nucleotides (G and C). The resulting DNA fragments are known as restriction fragments. HaeIII cuts both strands of DNA in the same location, yielding restriction fragments with blunt ends. Heat denaturation occurs at 80°C after 20 minutes.

== Methylase ==
Haemophilus aegyptius also carries a methylase dubbed HaeIIIM (P20589) that methylates the internal cytosines in the GGCC sequence. It protects sequences from being cut by HaeIII, and forms a restriction modification system. HaeIII enzyme comes from an E. coli strain that carries the cloned HaeIII modification gene from Haemophilus aegyptius.
