= CAG promoter =

Synthetic promoter in gene expression

The CAG promoter is a strong synthetic promoter frequently used to drive high levels of gene expression in mammalian expression vectors.

CAG promoter was constructed in the lab of Dr Jun-ichi Miyazaki from the following sequences:

(C) the cytomegalovirus (CMV) early enhancer element,
(A) the promoter, the first exon and the first intron of chicken beta-actin gene,
(G) the splice acceptor of the rabbit beta-globin gene

The resulting synthetic element was used in the pCAGGS expression vector. The initiation codon located at the proximal region of the second exon was disrupted by digesting with NcoI restriction enzyme and replacing the site with a HindIII linker.

Although the whole construct is commonly referred to as the "CAG promoter", it is not a promoter in a strict sense, as it includes a part of the transcribed sequence (the first exon and the first intron of chicken beta-actin gene) and enhancer elements. In addition to the CMV immediate early enhancer, the intron of the chicken beta actin gene contains an enhancer element, which is highly conserved among vertebrates. The 3' part of the promoter has high GC content and is thus refractory to PCR amplification.

Some of the CAG promoter functions as an effective tool that increases and maintains the expression level of recombinant proteins, as well as increasing the expression of transgenes under low temperature conditions.
