= Blunt end =

Blunt end may refer to:

- Sticky and blunt ends, the properties of the ends of linear DNA molecules
- the flat end cab of the British Rail Class 91, a high-speed electric locomotive
