= Type I site-specific deoxyribonuclease =

Identifiers
- EC no.: 3.1.21.3
- CAS no.: 37263-09-5

Databases
- IntEnz: IntEnz view
- BRENDA: BRENDA entry
- ExPASy: NiceZyme view
- KEGG: KEGG entry
- MetaCyc: metabolic pathway
- PRIAM: profile
- PDB structures: RCSB PDB PDBe PDBsum
Search
- PMC: articles
- PubMed: articles
- NCBI: proteins

Type I site-specific deoxyribonuclease (EC 3.1.21.3, type I restriction enzyme, deoxyribonuclease (ATP- and S-adenosyl-L-methionine-dependent), restriction-modification system, deoxyribonuclease (adenosine triphosphate-hydrolyzing), adenosine triphosphate-dependent deoxyribonuclease, ATP-dependent DNase, type 1 site-specific deoxyribonuclease) is an enzyme. This enzyme catalyses the following chemical reaction

Endonucleolytic cleavage of DNA to give random double-stranded fragments with terminal 5'-phosphates; ATP is simultaneously hydrolysed

They have an absolute requirement for ATP (or dATP) and S-adenosyl-L-methionine.

== See also ==
- Restriction enzyme
