= Type III site-specific deoxyribonuclease =

Identifiers
- EC no.: 3.1.21.5
- CAS no.: 2620833

Databases
- IntEnz: IntEnz view
- BRENDA: BRENDA entry
- ExPASy: NiceZyme view
- KEGG: KEGG entry
- MetaCyc: metabolic pathway
- PRIAM: profile
- PDB structures: RCSB PDB PDBe PDBsum
Search
- PMC: articles
- PubMed: articles
- NCBI: proteins

Type III site-specific deoxyribonuclease (EC 3.1.21.5, type III restriction enzyme, restriction-modification system) is an enzyme. This enzyme catalyses the following chemical reaction

Endonucleolytic cleavage of DNA to give specific double-stranded fragments with terminal 5'-phosphates

This group of enzymes has an absolute requirement for ATP, but does not hydrolyse it.

== See also ==
- Restriction enzyme
