= Saci =

Saci may refer to:

- An alternative spelling for the Hindu goddess Sachi
- Saci (Brazilian folklore), an impish mythical character of Brazilian folk tale
  - O Saci (film), a 1953 Brazilian film about the folklore character
- Prêmio Saci, a Brazilian award to honour theater and film performers
- "Saci", a song by Detonator e as Musas do Metal from Metal Folclore: The Zoeira Never Ends...
- SacI, a restriction enzyme
- SACI, an art college in Florence, Italy
- Wellington Saci (born 1985), Brazilian footballer
- The striped cuckoo, known as "saci" in Portuguese
