= NotI =

Restriction enzyme

NotI is a restriction enzyme isolated from the bacterium Nocardia otitidis.

== Recognition sequence ==
Palindromic recognition sequence of NotI:

5'-GCGGCCGC-3'
3'-CGCCGGCG-5'

The ends generated by NotI digest:

5'---GC     GGCCGC---3'
3'---CGCCGG     CG---5'
