= TaqI =

Restriction enzyme

TaqI is a restriction enzyme isolated from the bacterium Thermus aquaticus in 1978. It has a recognition sequence of

5'TCGA
3'AGCT

and makes the cut

5'---T   CGA---3'
3'---AGC   T---5'
