= Streptozotocin =

Chemical compound

Clinical data
- Trade names: Zanosar
- MedlinePlus: a684053
- Routes of administration: Intravenous
- ATC code: L01AD04 (WHO)

Legal status
- Legal status: In general: ℞ (Prescription only)

Pharmacokinetic data
- Bioavailability: 17–25% (100% if IV)
- Metabolism: Liver, kidney
- Elimination half-life: 35–40 minutes

Identifiers
- IUPAC name: 2-Deoxy-2-({[methyl(nitroso)amino]carbonyl}amino)-β-D-glucopyranose
- CAS Number: 18883-66-4
- PubChem CID: 29327
- DrugBank: DB00428
- ChemSpider: 27273
- UNII: 5W494URQ81
- KEGG: C07313
- ChEBI: CHEBI:9288
- ChEMBL: ChEMBL450214
- CompTox Dashboard (EPA): DTXSID2021282

Chemical and physical data
- Formula: C_{8}H_{15}N_{3}O_{7}
- Molar mass: 265.222 g·mol^{−1}
- 3D model (JSmol): Interactive image
- SMILES: CN(C(=O)N[C@@H]1[C@H]([C@@H]([C@H](O[C@@H]1O)CO)O)O)N=O
- InChI: InChI=1S/C8H15N3O7/c1-11(10-17)8(16)9-4-6(14)5(13)3(2-12)18-7(4)15/h3-7,12-15H,2H2,1H3,(H,9,16)/t3-,4-,5-,6-,7+/m1/s1; Key:ZSJLQEPLLKMAKR-GKHCUFPYSA-N

Streptozotocin or streptozocin (INN, USP) (STZ) is a naturally occurring alkylating antineoplastic agent that is particularly toxic to the insulin-producing beta cells of the pancreas in mammals. It is used in medicine for treating certain cancers of the islets of Langerhans and used in medical research to produce an animal model for hyperglycemia and Alzheimer's in a large dose, as well as type 2 diabetes or type 1 diabetes with multiple low doses.

== Usage ==
Streptozotocin is approved by the U.S. Food and Drug Administration (FDA) for treating metastatic cancer of the pancreatic islet cells. Since it carries a substantial risk of toxicity and rarely cures the cancer, its use is generally limited to patients whose cancer cannot be removed by surgery. In these patients, streptozotocin can reduce the tumor size and reduce symptoms (especially hypoglycemia due to excessive insulin secretion by insulinomas). A typical dose is 500 mg/m^{2}/day by intravenous injection, for 5 days, repeated every 4–6 weeks.

Due to its high toxicity to beta cells, in scientific research, streptozotocin has also been long used for inducing insulitis and diabetes on experimental animals. Streptozotocin has also been used for modeling Alzheimer's disease through memory loss in mice.

== Mechanism ==
Streptozotocin is a glucosamine-nitrosourea compound. As with other alkylating agents in the nitrosourea class, it is toxic to cells by causing damage to the DNA, though other mechanisms may also contribute. DNA damage induces activation of PARP which is likely more important for diabetes induction than the DNA damage itself. Streptozotocin is similar enough to glucose to be transported into the cell by the glucose transport protein GLUT2, but is not recognized by the other glucose transporters. This explains its relative toxicity to beta cells, since these cells have relatively high levels of GLUT2.

== History ==
Streptozotocin was originally identified in the late 1950s as an antibiotic. The drug was discovered in a strain of the soil microbe Streptomyces achromogenes by scientists at the drug company Upjohn (now part of Pfizer) in Kalamazoo, Michigan. The soil sample in which the microbe turned up had been taken from Blue Rapids, Kansas, which can therefore be considered the birthplace of streptozotocin. Upjohn filed for patent protection for the drug in August 1958 and U.S. patent 3,027,300 was granted in March 1962.

In the mid-1960s, streptozotocin was found to be selectively toxic to the beta cells of the pancreatic islets, the cells that normally regulate blood glucose levels by producing the hormone insulin. This suggested the drug's use as an animal model of diabetes, and as a medical treatment for cancers of the beta cells. In the 1960s and 1970s, the National Cancer Institute investigated streptozotocin's use in cancer chemotherapy. Upjohn filed for FDA approval of streptozotocin as a treatment for pancreatic islet cell cancer in November 1976, and approval was granted in July 1982. The drug was subsequently marketed as Zanosar.

More recently, a growing body of studies has provided evidence that derangement of insulin signaling underlying type-2 diabetes significantly increase the risk of cognitive impairment and Alzheimer's disease (AD) progression. On this ground, the direct administration of STZ in the brain (i.e., by intracerebroventricular (ICV) infusion) has been used to develop an animal model of brain insulin resistance to mimic in rodents the pathophysiology of sporadic AD, which represents the most common form of AD in humans. STZ infusion in the brain induced accumulation of Amyloid beta (Aβ) protein, oxidative stress and cognitive impairment. Notably, there is now evidence that STZ infusion within the brain produced up-regulation of amyloid precursor protein (APP), tau hyperphosphorylation and neuroinflammation. Treatment with the cleavage-specific anti-tau 12A12 monoclonal antibody (mAb) can relieve APP upregulation, neuroinflammation and reduce cerebral oxidative stress, mitochondrial impairment, synaptic and histological alterations, as well as induce a nearly complete recovery of cognitive impairment in the STZ-induced SAD mouse model.

Streptozotocin is now long off patent and many generic formulations are available.

== Biosynthesis ==
Recent advancements in understanding the biosynthesis of this natural product have been made by Balskus et al. In short, the authors found the gene cluster responsible for production of Streptozotocin in Streptomyces achromogenes and identified novel function of a non-heme iron enzyme, SznF, which forms the N-N bond in the N-nitrosourea pharmacophore by oxidative rearrangement.

== See also ==
- Alloxan
