= Nullomers =

DNA sequences not present in a genome of a species

Nullomers are short sequences of DNA that do not occur in the genome of a species (for example, humans), even though they are theoretically possible. Nullomers must be under selective pressure - for example, they may be toxic to the cell. Some nullomers have been shown to be useful to treat leukemia, breast, and prostate cancer. They are not useful in healthy cells because normal cells adapt and become immune to them. Nullomers are also being developed for use as DNA tags to prevent cross contamination when analyzing crime scene material.

== Background ==
Nullomers are naturally occurring but potentially unused sequences of DNA. Determining these "forbidden" sequences can improve the understanding of the basic rules that govern sequence evolution. Sequencing entire genomes has shown that there is a high level of non-uniformity in genomic sequences. When a codon is artificially substituted with a synonymous codon, it often results in a lethal change and cell death. This is believed to be due to ribosomal stalling and early termination of protein synthesis. For example, both AGA and CGA code for arginine in bacteria; however, bacteria almost never use AGA, and when substituted it proves lethal. Such codon biases have been observed in all species, and are examples of constraints on sequence evolution. Other sequences may have selective pressure; for example, GG-rich sequences are used as sacrificial sinks for oxidative damage because oxidizing agents are attracted to regions with GG-rich sequences and then induce strand breakage. Moreover, it has been shown that statistically significant nullomers (i.e. absent short sequences which are highly expected to exist) in virus genomes are restriction recognition sites indicating that viruses have probably got rid of these motifs to facilitate invasion of bacterial hosts. Nullomers Database provides a comprehensive collection of minimal absent sequences from hundreds of species and viruses as well as the human and mouse proteomes.

Sequence of Human nullomers of 11bp in length
No occurrence in the Human Genome	CGCTCGACGTA, GTCCGAGCGTA, CGACGAACGGT, CCGATACGTCG
One occurrence in the Human Genome	TACGCGCGACA, CGCGACGCATA, TCGGTACGCTA, TCGCGACCGTA, CGATCGTGCGA, CGCGTATCGGT
Two occurrences in the Human Genome	CGTCGCTCGAA, TCGCGCGAATA, TCGACGCGATA, ATCGTCGACGA, CTACGCGTCGA, CGTATACGCGA, CGATTACGCGA, CGATTCGGCGA, CGACGTACCGT, CGACGAACGAG, CGCGTAATACG, CGCGCTATACG
Three occurrences in the Human Genome	CGCGCATAATA, CGACGGCAGTA, CGAATCGCGTA, CGGTCGTACGA, GCGCGTACCGA, CGCGTAATCGA, CGTCGTTCGAC, CCGTCGAACGC, ACGCGCGATAT, CGAACGGTCGT, CGCGTAACGCG, CCGAATACGCG, CATATCGCGCG

Table of the number of nullomers present in different organisms and the nullomer length
Organism	10bp	11bp	12bp	13bp
Arabidopsis	107	23646	1167012	20237388
C Elegans	2	7686	1152038	23339534
Chicken	2	590	131515	4722702
Chimpanzee	0	136	45938	2426474
Cow	0	96	45060	2432554
Dog	0	40	25217	1868964
Fruitfly	0	206	221616	12399300
Human	0	80	39852	2232448
Mouse	0	178	54383	2625646
Rat	0	50	30708	1933220
Zebrafish	0	2	15561	2469558

== Cancer Treatment ==
Nullomers have been used as an approach to drug discovery and development. Nullomer peptides were screened for anti-cancer action. Absent sequences have short polyarginine tails added to increase solubility and uptake into the cell, producing peptides called PolyArgNulloPs. One successful sequence, RRRRRNWMWC, was demonstrated to have lethal effects in breast and prostate cancer. It damaged mitochondria by increasing ROS production, which reduced ATP production, leading to cell growth inhibition and cell death. Normal cells show a decreased sensitivity to PolyArgNulloPs over time.

== Forensics ==
Accidental transfer of biological material containing DNA can produce misleading results. This is a particularly important consideration in forensic and crime labs, where mistakes can cause an innocent person to be convicted of a crime. There was no way to detect if a reference sample was mislabeled as evidence or if a forensic sample is contaminated, but a nullomer barcode can be added to reference samples to distinguish them from evidence on analysis. Tagging can be carried out during sample collection without affecting genotype or quantification results. Impregnated filter paper with various nullomers can be used to soak up and store DNA samples from a crime scene, making the technology simple and effective. Tagging with nullomers can be detected—even when diluted to a million-fold and spilled on evidence, these tags are still clearly detected. Tagging in this way supports National Research Council's recommendations on quality control to reduce fraud and mistakes.
