= Dyad symmetry =

In genetics, dyad symmetry refers to two areas of a DNA strand whose base pair sequences are inverted repeats of each other. They are often described as palindromes.

For example, the following shows dyad symmetry between sequences GAATAC and GTATTC which are reverse complements of each other.

...GAATAC...CTG...GTATTC...

== Involvement in transcription ==
Since the two reverse complementary sequences will fold and base-pair with each other, the sequence of bases between them form a hairpin loop. This structure is thought to destabilize the binding of RNA polymerase enzyme to DNA (hence terminating transcription). Dyad symmetry is known to have a role in the rho independent method of transcription termination in E. coli. Regions of dyad symmetry in the DNA sequence stall the RNA polymerase enzyme as it transcribes them.

== Involvement in prophage integration ==
Temperate bacteriophages integrate into the host genome at specific interrupted dyad symmetry sequences using the phage encoded enzyme integrase (see prophage integration).
