= SacI =

Restriction enzyme

SacI is a restriction enzyme isolated from the bacterium Streptomyces achromogenes.
