= PstI =

Restriction enzyme

PstI is a type II restriction endonuclease isolated from the Gram negative species, Providencia stuartii.

== Function ==
PstI cleaves DNA at the recognition sequence 5′-CTGCA/G-3′ generating fragments with 3′-cohesive termini. This cleavage yields sticky ends 4 base pairs long. PstI is catalytically active as a dimer. The two subunits are related by a 2-fold symmetry axis which in the complex with the substrate coincides with the dyad axis of the recognition sequence. It has a molecular weight of 69,500 and contains 54 positive and 41 negatively charged residues.

Recognition Sequence

 5'CTGCAG 3'
 3'GACGTC 5'

Cut Site

 5'--CTGCA  G--3'
 3'--G  ACGTC—5'

The PstI restriction/modification (R/M) system has two components: a restriction enzyme that cleaves foreign DNA, and a methyltransferase which protect native DNA strands by methylation of the adenine base inside the recognition sequence. The combination of both provide is a defense mechanism against invading viruses. The methyltransferase and endonuclease are encoded as two separate proteins and act independently. In the PstI system, the genes are encoded on opposite strands and hence must be transcribed divergently from separate promoters. The transcription initiation sites are separated by only 70 base pairs. A delay in the expression of the endonuclease relative to methylase is due to the inherent differences of the two proteins. The endonuclease is a dimer, requiring a second step for assembly, whereas the methylase is a monomer.

PstI is functionally equivalent to BsuBI. Both enzymes recognize the target sequence 5'CTGCAG. The enzyme systems have similar methyltransferases (41% amino acid identity), restriction endonucleases (46% amino acid identity), and genetic makeup (58% nucleotide identity). These observations suggest a shared evolutionary history.

When examining the preferential double strand cleavage of DNA, the restriction endonuclease PstI bind to pSM1 plasmid DNA.

== DNA cloning ==
PstI is a useful enzyme for DNA cloning as it provides a selective system for generating hybrid DNA molecules. These hybrid DNA molecules can be then cleaved at the regenerated PstI sites. Its use is not limited to molecular cloning; it is also used in restriction site mapping, genotyping, Southern blotting, restriction fragment length polymorphism (RFLP) and SNP. It is also an isoschizomer restriction enzyme SalPI from Streptomyces albus P.

== Cleavage ==
PstI preferentially cleaves purified pSM1 DNA without being influenced by the superhelicity of the substrate. However, it is not known whether the effects of this cleavage occurs upon binding to the recognition site or DNA scission. Its differential cleavage rates at different restriction sites is due to the five features of duplex structure. The proximity to the ends in linear DNA molecule, variation in DNA sequence within the recognition sites for enzymes, short distance between regions of unusual DNA sequences and recognition sites, and lastly the special structures such as loops and hairpins. The collective effect of these five factors could affect the accessibility of the restriction enzyme to its recognition sites.
