= XbaI =

Restriction enzyme

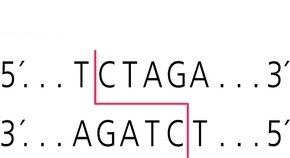
Xba I cutting site.

XbaI is a restriction enzyme isolated from the bacterium Xanthomonas badrii
