= ZFA =

ZFA may refer to:

- Zanzibar Football Association, Tanzania
- Zionist Federation of Australia
- Zionist Freedom Alliance
- Faro Airport (Yukon), IATA airport code
- Zentrum für Antisemitismusforschung (Center for Research on Antisemitism, Berlin, Germany)
- Central Agency for German Schools Abroad (Zentralstelle für das Auslandsschulwesen), Federal Office of Administration of the German government
- Zermelo–Fraenkel set theory with atoms, a urelement
