= Bacterial blight of cotton =

Xanthomonas axonopodis pv. malvacearum

Scientific classification
- Domain: Bacteria
- Kingdom: Pseudomonadati
- Phylum: Pseudomonadota
- Class: Gammaproteobacteria
- Order: Lysobacterales
- Family: Lysobacteraceae
- Genus: Xanthomonas
- Species: X. axonopodis
- Pathovar: X. a. pv. malvacearum

Trionomial name
- Xanthomonas axonopodis pv. malvacearum

Disease affecting the cotton plant

Bacterial blight of cotton is a disease affecting the cotton plant resulting from infection by Xanthomonas axonopodis pathovar malvacearum (Xcm) a Gram negative, motile rod-shaped, non spore-forming bacterium with a single polar flagellum

== Symptoms ==
The bacteria can affect the cotton plant during all growth stages, infecting stems, leaves, bracts and bolls. It causes seedling blight, leaf spot, blackarm (on stem and petioles), black vein and boll rot. On cotyledons small, green, water-soaked rounded (or irregular) spots form which turn brown. Cotyledons can be distorted if the infection is intense. Black and elongated lesions can girdle the hypocotyls and kill seedlings. On the leaves, scattered small dark-green, water-soaked, areolate spots, form measuring 1–2 mm on the lower surface, which appear translucent against transmitted light. The spots increase in diameter to 5 mm, become angular (due to leaf veination), brown and later turn dark brown to blackish, becoming visible on the upper surface. On susceptible cultivars numerous spots can occur, causing chlorosis, necrosis and distortion, and eventually defoliation. the black arm symptom is characterized by dark brown to black lesions which may coalesce and the extended necrosis then girdles the stem with blockage of the vascular system at infected sites which hinder the movement of water and nutrients though the plant system. Drooping of leaves is associated with this hindrance of water and nutrient movement. Cracking of the stem and gummosis is also observed in infected plants. The resultant breaking of the stem which hang typically as a dry black twig is referred to as the ‘black arm’. The pathogen also reportedly causes blackening of the veins and veinlets, giving a typical ‘blighting’ appearance.

== Physiology and mechanisms ==
Plant defenses play an integral role in directing how plants develop resistance to the various diseases that threaten to attack the plant. They provide the cheapest and best strategy to fight pest and disease infections, especially in plants grown for commercial purposes. Despite the prevalent nature of the blight bacteria in cotton plants, some cotton genotypes have developed defenses to resist infections from the bacteria. The resistance is characterized by a series of physiological series, mechanisms, and physical observations.

An observation of cotton tissue during resistance reveals; disorganization of organelles such as nuclei and chloroplasts, rapidly collapsed cells at the infection areas, and condensed cytoplasm (Al-Mousawi et al., 1982). The physiological resistance is carried out in series of mechanisms; oxidative burst, systematic resistance, the oxylipin pathway, and accumulation of sesquiterpenoid (Martinez et al., 2000).

The oxidative burst which occurs during fiber elongation is responsible for releasing reactive oxygen species. Systematic resistance is a phase of resistance response (SAR), marked by the release of salicylic acid at the infected sites of the oxidative burst. The oxylipin pathway is characterized by ethylene-response transcription factors that play a major role in integrating signals to activate jasmonic acid, which initiates resistance (Champion et al., 2009). The last phase is characterized by the accumulation of sesquiterpenoid phytoalexins, which stop bacteria from multiplying.

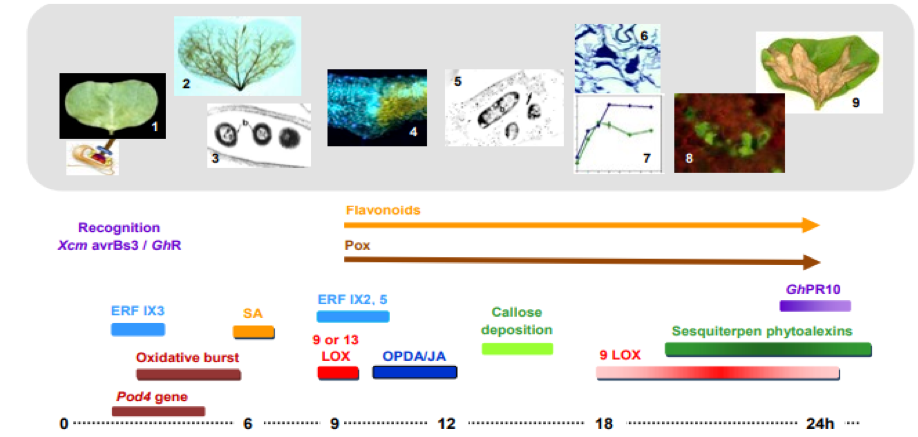
The time sequence of physiological events of the cotton plant during bacterial blight resistance

On being infected with the blight bacteria (1 and 3), the bacterial cells inject the effectors created to develop resistance genes within the host nuclei. When host R proteins recognize the bacteria, some specific mechanisms are activated through signaling pathways. Genes of the ERF IX3 group are transcribed parallel to ROS production (t = 3h; 2: localization of H_{2}O_{2} in resistant leaves). Accumulation of salicylic acid in the systematic resistance stage culminates after the burst leading to activation of a 9- or 13-Lox gene (t = 9h), transcription of Ethylene-response transcription factors(ERF) genes, and synthesis of OPDA/JA (t = 12h). At the same time, flavonoids and total peroxidase activity are also released to aid in resisting the bacteria. The resistance aims at stopping bacterial growth (7: green line) as compared to growth in susceptible plants (7: blue line) and is preceded by the collapse of cells (6: condensation of the cytoplasm of HR cells), concluding the HR cycle (Jalloul et al., 2015).

Resistance to the cotton blight bacteria is one of the primary objectives for cotton plant breeders. Although cotton plant resistance may be to a particular Xcm race, it reveals how the physiological characteristics of plants can effectively aid in plant resistance to diseases and pest attacks. Cloning of the R genes can be used to develop multi genetic resistance. Further research should focus on establishing the relationships between cotton R proteins and Xcm effectors. This will form the basis for developing Xcm resistant cotton increasing production, and reducing costs.
