= Ydc2 protein domain =

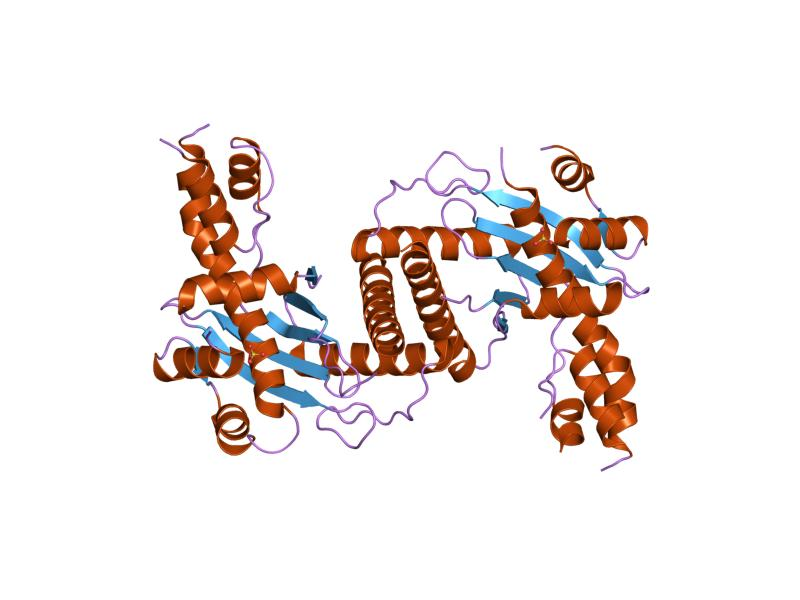
- Crystal structure of the yeast mitochondrial Holliday junction resolvase, YDC2

Identifiers
- Symbol: Ydc2-catalyst
- Pfam: PF09159
- Pfam clan: CL0219
- InterPro: IPR015242
- SCOP2: 1kcf / SCOPe / SUPFAM
- CDD: cd00529
Available protein structures:
- Pfam: structures / ECOD
- PDB: RCSB PDB; PDBe; PDBj
- PDBsum: structure summary

In molecular biology, the protein domain, Ydc2 (also known as SpCce1), is a Holliday junction resolvase from the fission yeast Schizosaccharomyces pombe that is involved in the maintenance of mitochondrial DNA.

== Function ==
The Ydc2 domains are enzymes (or "biological catalysts") that resolve Holliday junctions into separate DNA duplexes by cleaving DNA after 5'-CT-3, and 5'-TT-3, sequences.

== Properties ==
The junction resolving enzymes are very diverse, but have the following properties in common:

- high structure specificity for binding
- metal dependent, sequence specific cleavage activity

Essentially, they are highly specific.

== Limiting factors ==
Furthermore, the cleavage efficiency is affected by:

- strand type (continuous or exchange)
- nucleotide sequence at cleavage site

== Structure ==
This protein domain forms a ribonuclease H fold consisting of two beta sheets and one alpha helix, arranged as a beta-alpha-beta motif. Each beta sheet has five strands, arranged in a 32145 order, with the second strand being antiparallel to the rest.
