= Streptomyces achromogenes =

Scientific classification
- Domain: Bacteria
- Kingdom: Bacillati
- Phylum: Actinomycetota
- Class: Actinomycetia
- Order: Streptomycetales
- Family: Streptomycetaceae
- Genus: Streptomyces
- Species: S. achromogenes

Binomial name
- Streptomyces achromogenes Okami and Umezawa 1953 (Approved Lists 1980)

Species of bacterium

Streptomyces achromogenes is a species of gram-positive bacterium that belongs in the genus Streptomyces. S. achromogenes can be grown at 28 °C in a medium of yeast and malt extract with glucose.

Streptomyces achromogenes is the source of the restriction enzymes SacI and SacII, as well as the antibiotic compound sarcidin. A strain of the bacterium called S. achromogenes var. streptozoticus was the original source of the pancreatic cancer drug streptozotocin.
