= BamHI =

Restriction enzyme

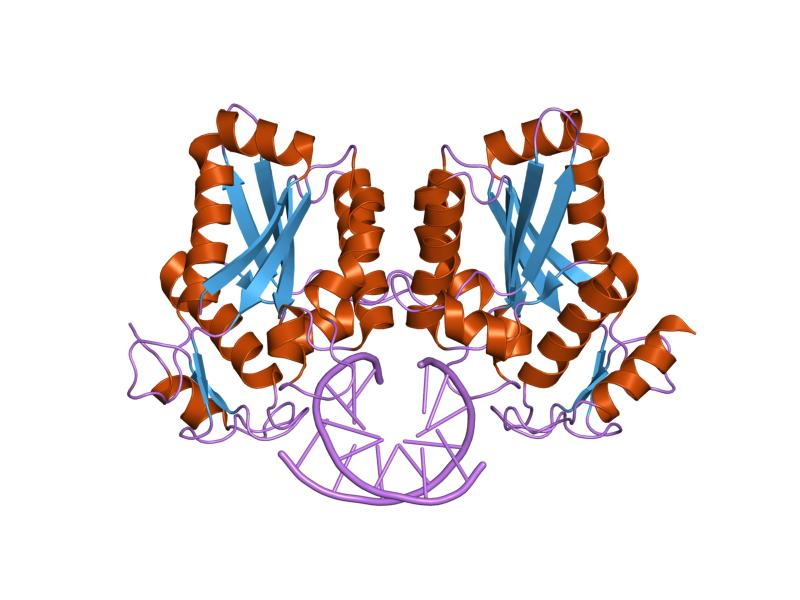
- Restriction endonuclease BamHI bound to a non-specific DNA.

Identifiers
- Symbol: BamHI
- Pfam: PF02923
- Pfam clan: CL0236
- InterPro: IPR004194
- SCOP2: 1bhm / SCOPe / SUPFAM
Available protein structures:
- PDB: IPR004194 PF02923 (ECOD; PDBsum)
- AlphaFold: IPR004194; PF02923

BamHI (pronounced "Bam H one") (from Bacillus amyloliquefaciens) is a type II restriction endonuclease, having the capacity for recognizing short sequences (6 bp) of DNA and specifically cleaving them at a target site. This exhibit focuses on the structure-function relations of BamHI as described by Newman, et al. (1995). BamHI binds at the recognition sequence 5'-GGATCC-3', and cleaves these sequences just after the 5'-guanine on each strand. This cleavage results in sticky ends which are 4 bp long. In its unbound form, BamHI displays a central b sheet, which resides in between α-helices. BamHI undergoes a series of unconventional conformational changes upon DNA recognition. This allows the DNA to maintain its normal B-DNA conformation without distorting to facilitate enzyme binding. BamHI is a symmetric dimer. DNA is bound in a large cleft that is formed between dimers; the enzyme binds in a "crossover" manner. Each BamHI subunit makes the majority of its backbone contacts with the phosphates of a DNA half site but base pair contacts are made between each BamHI subunit and nitrogenous bases in the major groove of the opposite DNA half site. The protein binds the bases through either direct hydrogen bonds or water-mediated H-bonds between the protein and every H-bond donor/acceptor group in the major groove. Major groove contacts are formed by atoms residing on the amino-terminus of a parallel 4 helix bundle. This bundle marks the BamHI dimer interface, and it is thought that the dipole moments of the NH_{2}-terminal atoms on this bundle may contribute to electrostatic stabilization.

== Sites of DNA recognition ==
The BamHI enzyme is capable of making a large number of contacts with DNA. Water-mediated hydrogen bonding, as well as both main-chain and side-chain interactions aid in binding of the BamHI recognition sequence. In the major groove, the majority of enzyme/DNA contacts take place at the amino terminus of the parallel-4-helix bundle, made up of a4 and a6 from each subunit. Although a6 from each subunit does not enter the DNA major groove, it's preceding loops interact with the outer ends of the recognition site. Conversely, a4 from each subunit does enter the major groove in the center of the recognition sequence. A total of 18 bonds are formed between the enzyme and DNA across the 6 base pair recognition sequence (12 direct and 6 water mediated bonds). Arg155 and Asp154 located in a spiral ring before a6 are connected with G:C base pairs outside while the middle G:C pairs are connected with Asp154, Arg122, and Asn116 (direct binding). Hydrogen bonding between water and Asn116 results in binding at A:T base pairs inside (water-mediated binding). As discussed above, the L and R subunits bind in a cross over manner, whereby the R-subunit of BamHI contacts the left DNA half-site of the recognition sequence. The binding of each BamHI subunit is precisely the same as its symmetrical partner. The recognition site for BamHI has a palindromic sequence which can be cut in half for ease in showing bonds.

== Recognition site ==
G G A T C C
C C T A G G

As of the end of 2010, there were 5 crystal structures of BamHI in the Protein Data Bank

== Two-metal mechanism ==
BamHI, like other type II restriction endonucleases, often requires divalent metals as cofactors to catalyze DNA cleavage. Two-metal ion mechanism is one of the possible catalytic mechanisms of BamHI since the BamHI crystal structure has the ability to bind two metal ions at the active site, which is suitable for the classical two-metal ion mechanism to proceed. Two-metal ion mechanism is the use of two metal ions to catalyze the cleavage reaction of restriction enzyme. BamHI has three critical active site residues that are important for metal catalyst. They are known as Asp94, Glu111 and Glu113. These residues are usually acidic. In the presence of a metal ion, the residues are pointed toward the metal ion. In the absence of metal ions, the residues are pointed outward. The two metal ions (A and B) are 4.1 apart from each other in the active site and are in-line with these residues. In general, when the two metal ions (A and B) are bonded to the active site, they help stabilize a cluster distribution of negative charges localized at the active site created by the leaving of an oxygen atom during the transition state. First, a water molecule will be activated by metal ion A at the active site. This water molecule will act as the attacking molecule attacking the BamHI-DNA complex and thus making the complex negative. Later, another water will bound to metal ion B and donate a proton to the leaving group of complex, stabilizing the build-up of negative charge on the leaving oxygen atom.

The function of Ca^{2+} in the active site of BamHI is known. It is an inhibitor of DNA cleavage, converting BamHI into the pre-reactive state. This revealed the water molecular is the attacking molecule. It donates a proton to the leaving group that is bounded to Ca^{2+} forming a 90° O-P-O bond angles. If Glu 113 is replaced by lysine, the cleavage is lost since Glu 113 accepts the proton from the attacking water molecule.

== Biological significance ==
Because of its ability to recognize specific DNA sequence and cleave by a nuclease, BamHI carries various importances in understanding Type II restriction endonuclease, cloning DNA, and possibly treating certain DNA mutation-derived diseases through genetic therapy. NARP and MILS syndromes, for example, are mitochondrial diseases that can be caused by mutations in the mitochondrial DNA. Mitochondria can recover its functions after the excision of the mutant sequence through restriction endonuclease.
