= EcoRI =

Restriction enzyme

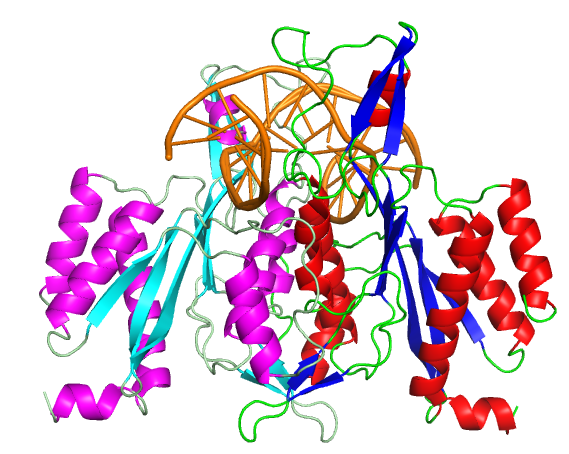
- EcoRI crystal structure. Dimer bound to DNA (PDB 1ckq)

Identifiers
- Symbol: EcoRI
- Pfam: PF02963
- InterPro: IPR004221
- SCOP2: 1na6 / SCOPe / SUPFAM
- CDD: 79lll
Available protein structures:
- PDB: IPR004221 PF02963 (ECOD; PDBsum)
- AlphaFold: IPR004221; PF02963

EcoRI (pronounced "eco R one") is a type II restriction enzyme isolated from Escherichia coli. It cleaves DNA double helices into fragments at specific sites, and is also a part of the restriction modification system. The enzyme's name originates from the species from which it was isolated: "E" denotes generic name (Escherichia), "co" denotes species name (coli), "R" represents the strain (RY13), and the "I" denotes that it was the first enzyme isolated from this strain.

In molecular biology it is used for restriction digests. EcoRI creates sticky ends with 5' end overhangs of AATT. The nucleic acid recognition sequence where the enzyme cuts is G↓AATTC, which has a palindromic complementary sequence of CTTAA↓G.

== History ==
EcoRI was one of the first type II restriction enzymes discovered.

It was first isolated in 1970 by Robert Yoshimori, a PhD student working with Herb Boyer and Daisy Roulland-Dussoix. Yoshimori was investigating restriction enzyme systems in the plasmids of clinical E. coli isolates.

== Structure ==
=== Primary structure ===
EcoRI contains the PD..D/EXK motif within its active site like many restriction endonucleases.

=== Tertiary and quaternary structure ===
The enzyme is a homodimer of a 31 kilodalton subunit consisting of one globular domain of the α/β architecture. Each subunit contains a loop which sticks out from the globular domain and wraps around the DNA when bound.

EcoRI recognition site with cutting pattern indicated by a green line

EcoRI has been cocrystallized with the sequence it normally cuts. This crystal was used to solve the structure of the complex (1QPS). The solved crystal structure shows that the subunits of the enzyme homodimer interact with the DNA symmetrically. In the complex, two α-helices from each subunit come together to form a four-helix bundle. On the interacting helices are residues Glu144 and Arg145, which interact together, forming a crosstalk ring that is believed to allow the enzyme's two active sites to communicate.

== Uses ==
Restriction enzymes are used in a wide variety of molecular genetics techniques including cloning, DNA screening and deleting sections of DNA in vitro. Restriction enzymes, like EcoRI, that generate sticky ends of DNA are often used to cut DNA prior to ligation, as sticky ends make the ligation reaction more efficient. One example of this use is in recombinant DNA production, when joining donor and vector DNA. EcoRI can exhibit non-site-specific cutting, known as star activity, depending on the conditions present in the reaction. Conditions that can induce star activity when using EcoRI include low salt concentration, high glycerol concentration, excessive amounts of enzyme present in the reaction, high pH and contamination with certain organic solvents.

== See also ==
- EcoRII, another nuclease enzyme from E. coli.
- EcoRV, another nuclease enzyme from E. coli.
