= Restriction enzyme =

Class of enzymes that divide DNA

An enzyme, usually derived from bacteria, that cuts double-stranded DNA at a specific sequence of nucleotide bases.

A restriction enzyme, restriction endonuclease, REase, ENase or restrictase is an enzyme that cleaves DNA into fragments at or near specific recognition sites within molecules known as restriction sites. Restriction enzymes are one class of the broader endonuclease group of enzymes. Restriction enzymes are commonly classified into five types, which differ in their structure and whether they cut their DNA substrate at their recognition site, or if the recognition and cleavage sites are separate from one another. To cut DNA, all restriction enzymes make two incisions, once through each sugar-phosphate backbone (i.e. each strand) of the DNA double helix.

These enzymes are found in bacteria and archaea and provide a defense mechanism against invading viruses. Inside a prokaryote, the restriction enzymes selectively cut up foreign DNA in a process called restriction digestion; meanwhile, host DNA is protected by a modification enzyme (a methyltransferase) that modifies the prokaryotic DNA and blocks cleavage. Together, these two processes form the restriction modification system.

More than 3,600 restriction endonucleases are known which represent over 250 different specificities. Over 3,000 of these have been studied in detail, and more than 800 of these are available commercially. These enzymes are routinely used for DNA modification in laboratories, and they are a vital tool in molecular cloning.

== History ==
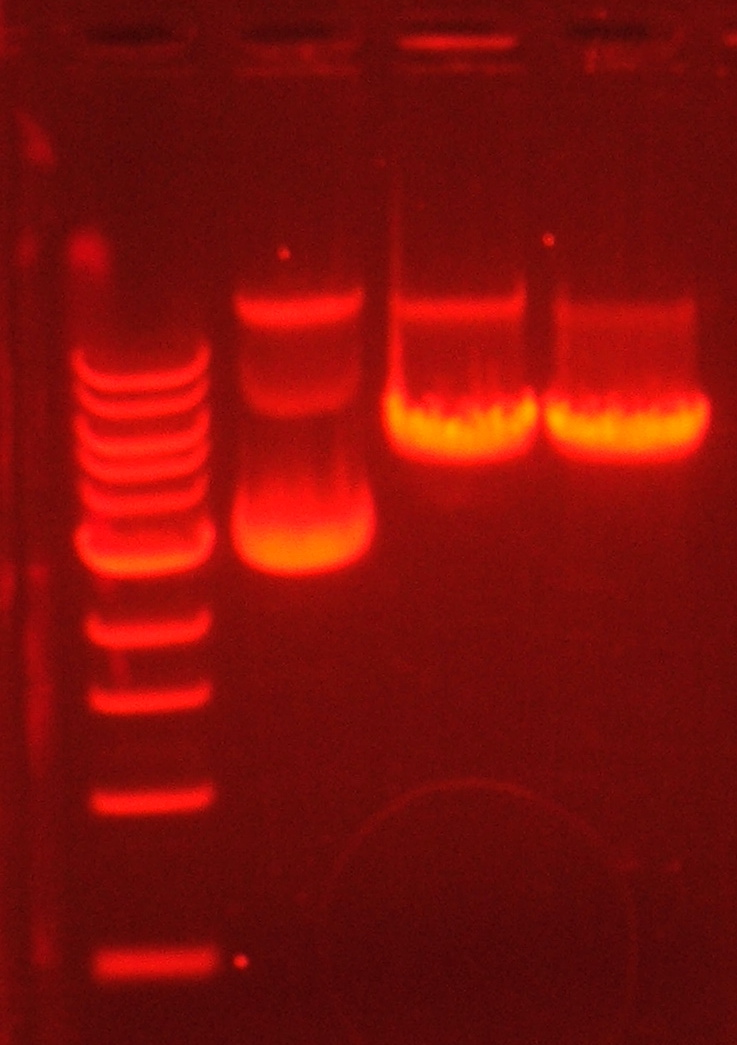
Different restriction enzymes acting on different recognition sites produce different DNA fragments

The term restriction enzyme originated from the studies of phage λ, a virus that infects bacteria, and the phenomenon of host-controlled restriction and modification of such bacterial phage or bacteriophage. The phenomenon was first identified in work done in the laboratories of Salvador Luria, Jean Weigle and Giuseppe Bertani in the early 1950s. It was found that, for a bacteriophage λ that can grow well in one strain of Escherichia coli, for example E. coli C, when grown in another strain, for example E. coli K, its yields can drop significantly, by as much as three to five orders of magnitude. The host cell, in this example E. coli K, is known as the restricting host and appears to have the ability to reduce the biological activity of the phage λ. If a phage becomes established in one strain, the ability of that phage to grow also becomes restricted in other strains. In the 1960s, it was shown in work done in the laboratories of Werner Arber and Matthew Meselson that the restriction is caused by an enzymatic cleavage of the phage DNA, and the enzyme involved was therefore termed a restriction enzyme.

The restriction enzymes studied by Arber and Meselson were type I restriction enzymes, which cleave DNA randomly away from the recognition site. In 1970, Hamilton O. Smith, Thomas Kelly and Kent Wilcox isolated and characterized the first type II restriction enzyme, HindII, from the bacterium Haemophilus influenzae. Restriction enzymes of this type are more useful for laboratory work as they cleave DNA at the site of their recognition sequence and are the most commonly used as a molecular biology tool. Later, Daniel Nathans and Kathleen Danna showed that cleavage of simian virus 40 (SV40) DNA by restriction enzymes yields specific fragments that can be separated using polyacrylamide gel electrophoresis, thus showing that restriction enzymes can also be used for mapping DNA. For their work in the discovery and characterization of restriction enzymes, the 1978 Nobel Prize for Physiology or Medicine was awarded to Werner Arber, Daniel Nathans, and Hamilton O. Smith. The discovery of restriction enzymes allows DNA to be manipulated, leading to the development of recombinant DNA technology that has many applications, for example, allowing the large scale production of proteins such as human insulin used by diabetic patients.

== Origins ==
Restriction enzymes likely evolved from a common ancestor and became widespread via horizontal gene transfer. In addition, there is mounting evidence that restriction endonucleases evolved as a selfish genetic element.

== Recognition site ==
A palindromic recognition site reads the same on the reverse strand as it does on the forward strand when both are read in the same orientation.

Restriction enzymes recognize a specific sequence of nucleotides and produce a double-stranded cut in the DNA. The recognition sequences can also be classified by the number of bases in its recognition site, usually between 4 and 8 bases, and the number of bases in the sequence will determine how often the site will appear by chance in any given genome, e.g., a 4-base pair sequence would theoretically occur once every 4^4 or 256bp, 6 bases, 4^6 or 4,096bp, and 8 bases would be 4^8 or 65,536bp. Many of them are palindromic, meaning the base sequence reads the same backwards and forwards. In theory, there are two types of palindromic sequences that can be possible in DNA. The mirror-like palindrome is similar to those found in ordinary text, in which a sequence reads the same forward and backward on a single strand of DNA, as in GTAATG. The inverted repeat palindrome is also a sequence that reads the same forward and backward, but the forward and backward sequences are found in complementary DNA strands (i.e., of double-stranded DNA), as in GTATAC (GTATAC being complementary to CATATG). Inverted repeat palindromes are more common and have greater biological importance than mirror-like palindromes.

EcoRI digestion produces "sticky" ends,

whereas SmaI restriction enzyme cleavage produces "blunt" ends:

Recognition sequences in DNA differ for each restriction enzyme, producing differences in the length, sequence and strand orientation (5' end or 3' end) of a sticky-end "overhang" of an enzyme restriction.

Different restriction enzymes that recognize the same sequence are known as isoschizomers. Different enzymes that recognize the same location, but cut at a different position are known as neoschizomers.

== Types ==
Naturally occurring restriction endonucleases are categorized into five groups (Types I, II, III, IV, and V) based on their composition and enzyme cofactor requirements, the nature of their target sequence, and the position of their DNA cleavage site relative to the target sequence. DNA sequence analysis of restriction enzymes however show great variations, indicating that there are more than four types. All types of enzymes recognize specific short DNA sequences and carry out the endonucleolytic cleavage of DNA to give specific fragments with terminal 5'-phosphates. They differ in their recognition sequence, subunit composition, cleavage position, and cofactor requirements, as summarised below:

- Type I enzymes (EC 3.1.21.3) cleave at sites remote from a recognition site; require both ATP and S-adenosyl-L-methionine to function; multifunctional protein with both restriction digestion and methylase (EC 2.1.1.72) activities.
- Type II enzymes (EC 3.1.21.4) cleave within or at short specific distances from a recognition site; most require magnesium; single function (restriction digestion) enzymes independent of methylase.
- Type III enzymes (EC 3.1.21.5) cleave at sites a short distance from a recognition site; require ATP (but do not hydrolyse it); S-adenosyl-L-methionine stimulates the reaction but is not required; exist as part of a complex with a modification methylase (EC 2.1.1.72).
- Type IV enzymes target modified DNA, e.g. methylated, hydroxymethylated and glucosyl-hydroxymethylated DNA
- Type V enzymes utilize guide RNAs (gRNAs)

=== Type l ===
Type I restriction enzymes were the first to be identified and were first identified in two different strains (K-12 and B) of E. coli. These enzymes cut at a site that differs, and is a random distance (at least 1000 bp) away, from their recognition site. Cleavage at these random sites follows a process of DNA translocation, which shows that these enzymes are also molecular motors. The recognition site is asymmetrical and is composed of two specific portions—one containing 3–4 nucleotides, and another containing 4–5 nucleotides—separated by a non-specific spacer of about 6–8 nucleotides. These enzymes are multifunctional and are capable of both restriction digestion and modification activities, depending upon the methylation status of the target DNA. The cofactors S-Adenosyl methionine (SAM, or AdoMet), hydrolyzed adenosine triphosphate (ATP), and magnesium (Mg^{2+}) ions, are required for their full activity. Type I restriction enzymes possess three subunits called HsdR, HsdM, and HsdS; HsdR is required for restriction digestion; HsdM is necessary for adding methyl groups to host DNA (methyltransferase activity), and HsdS is important for specificity of the recognition (DNA-binding) site in addition to both restriction digestion (DNA cleavage) and modification (DNA methyltransferase) activity.

=== Type II ===
Type II site-specific deoxyribonuclease-like
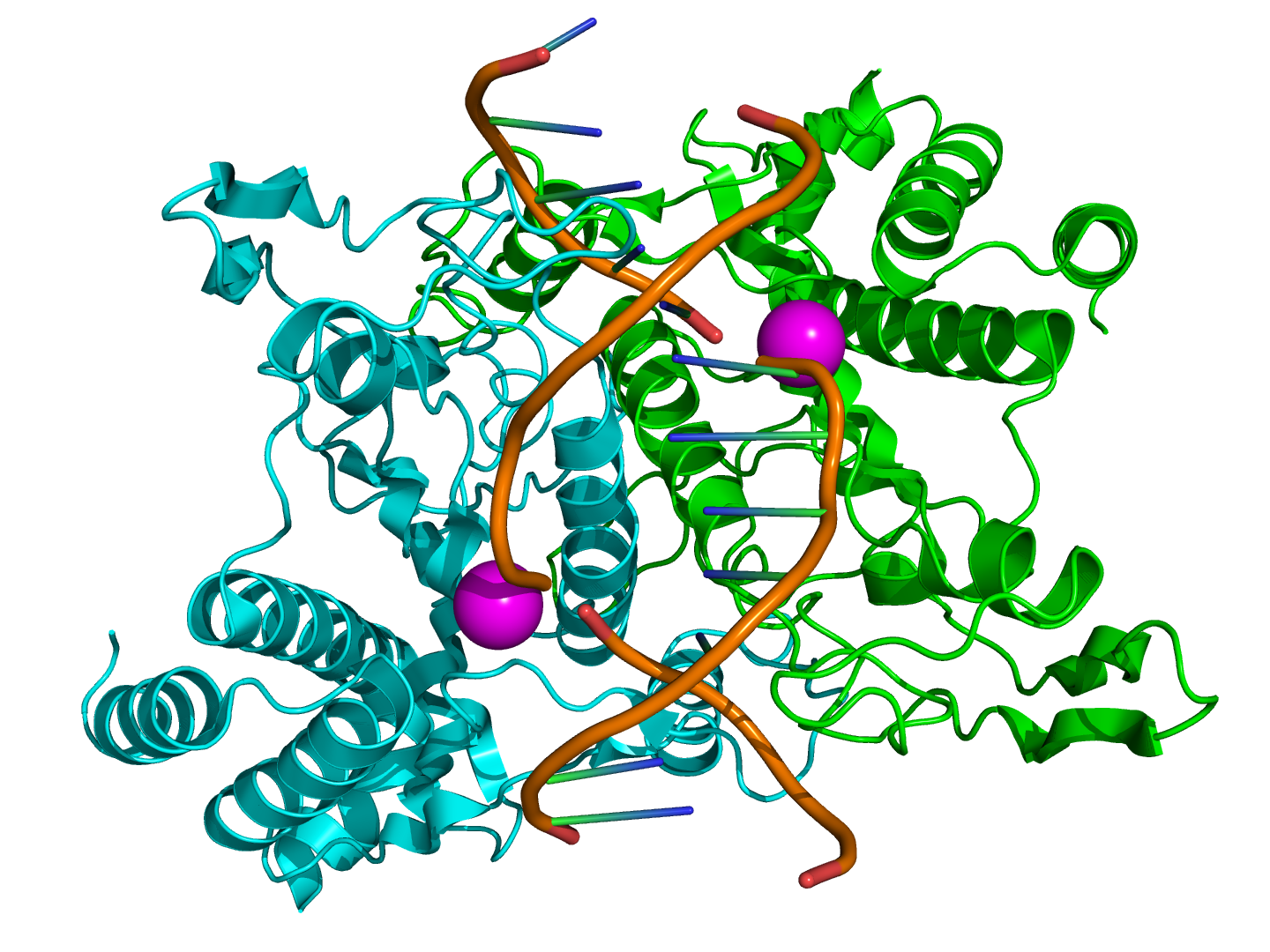
- Structure of the homodimeric restriction enzyme EcoRI (cyan and green cartoon diagram) bound to double stranded DNA (brown tubes). Two catalytic magnesium ions (one from each monomer) are shown as magenta spheres and are adjacent to the cleaved sites in the DNA made by the enzyme (depicted as gaps in the DNA backbone).

Identifiers
- Symbol: Restrct_endonuc-II-like
- Pfam clan: CL0236
- InterPro: IPR011335
- SCOP2: 1wte / SCOPe / SUPFAM
Available protein structures:
- PDB: IPR011335
- AlphaFold: IPR011335

Typical type II restriction enzymes differ from type I restriction enzymes in several ways. They form homodimers, with recognition sites that are usually undivided and palindromic and 4–8 nucleotides in length. They recognize and cleave DNA at the same site, and they do not use ATP or SAM for their activity—they usually require only Mg^{2+} as a cofactor. These enzymes cleave the phosphodiester bond of double helix DNA. It can either cleave at the center of both strands to yield a blunt end, or at a staggered position leaving overhangs called sticky ends. These are the most commonly available and used restriction enzymes. In the 1990s and early 2000s, new enzymes from this family were discovered that did not follow all the classical criteria of this enzyme class, and new subfamily nomenclature was developed to divide this large family into subcategories based on deviations from typical characteristics of type II enzymes. These subgroups are defined using a letter suffix.

Type IIB restriction enzymes (e.g., BcgI and BplI) are multimers, containing more than one subunit. They cleave DNA on both sides of their recognition to cut out the recognition site. They require both SAM and Mg^{2+} cofactors. Type IIE restriction endonucleases (e.g., NaeI) cleave DNA following interaction with two copies of their recognition sequence. One recognition site acts as the target for cleavage, while the other acts as an allosteric effector that speeds up or improves the efficiency of enzyme cleavage. Similar to type IIE enzymes, type IIF restriction endonucleases (e.g. NgoMIV) interact with two copies of their recognition sequence but cleave both sequences at the same time. Type IIG restriction endonucleases (e.g., RM.Eco57I) do have a single subunit, like classical Type II restriction enzymes, but require the cofactor SAM to be active. Type IIM restriction endonucleases, such as DpnI, are able to recognize and cut methylated DNA. Type IIS restriction endonucleases (e.g. FokI) cleave DNA at a defined distance from their non-palindromic asymmetric recognition sites; this characteristic is widely used to perform in-vitro cloning techniques such as Golden Gate cloning. These enzymes may function as dimers. Similarly, Type IIT restriction enzymes (e.g., Bpu10I and BslI) are composed of two different subunits. Some recognize palindromic sequences while others have asymmetric recognition sites.

=== Type III ===
Type III restriction enzymes (e.g., EcoP15) recognize two separate non-palindromic sequences that are inversely oriented. They cut DNA about 20–30 base pairs after the recognition site. These enzymes contain more than one subunit and require SAM and ATP cofactors for their roles in DNA methylation and restriction digestion, respectively. They are components of prokaryotic DNA restriction-modification mechanisms that protect the organism against invading foreign DNA. Type III enzymes are hetero-oligomeric, multifunctional proteins composed of two subunits, Res (P08764) and Mod (P08763). The Mod subunit recognises the DNA sequence specific for the system and is a modification methyltransferase; as such, it is functionally equivalent to the M and S subunits of type I restriction endonuclease. Res is required for restriction digestion, although it has no enzymatic activity on its own. Type III enzymes recognise short 5–6 bp-long asymmetric DNA sequences and cleave 25–27 bp downstream to leave short, single-stranded 5' protrusions. They require the presence of two inversely oriented unmethylated recognition sites for restriction digestion to occur. These enzymes methylate only one strand of the DNA, at the N-6 position of adenine residues, so newly replicated DNA will have only one strand methylated, which is sufficient to protect against restriction digestion. Type III enzymes belong to the beta-subfamily of N6 adenine methyltransferases, containing the nine motifs that characterise this family, including motif I, the SAM binding pocket (FXGXG), and motif IV, the catalytic region (S/D/N (PP) Y/F).

=== Type IV ===
Type IV enzymes recognize modified, typically methylated DNA and are exemplified by the McrBC and Mrr systems of E. coli.

=== Type V ===
Type V restriction enzymes (e.g., the cas9-gRNA complex from CRISPRs) utilize guide RNAs to target specific non-palindromic sequences found on invading organisms. They can cut DNA of variable length, provided that a suitable guide RNA is provided. The flexibility and ease of use of these enzymes make them promising for future genetic engineering applications.

=== Artificial restriction enzymes ===
Artificial restriction enzymes can be generated by fusing a natural or engineered DNA-binding domain to a nuclease domain (often the cleavage domain of the type IIS restriction enzyme FokI). Such artificial restriction enzymes can target large DNA sites (up to 36 bp) and can be engineered to bind to desired DNA sequences. Zinc finger nucleases are the most commonly used artificial restriction enzymes and are generally used in genetic engineering applications, but can also be used for more standard gene cloning applications. Other artificial restriction enzymes are based on the DNA binding domain of TAL effectors.

In 2013, a new technology CRISPR-Cas9, based on a prokaryotic viral defense system, was engineered for editing the genome, and it was quickly adopted in laboratories. For more detail, read CRISPR (Clustered regularly interspaced short palindromic repeats).

In 2017, a group from University of Illinois reported using an Argonaute protein taken from Pyrococcus furiosus (PfAgo) along with guide DNA to edit DNA in vitro as artificial restriction enzymes.

Artificial ribonucleases that act as restriction enzymes for RNA have also been developed. A PNA-based system, called a PNAzyme, has a Cu(II)-2,9-dimethylphenanthroline group that mimics ribonucleases for specific RNA sequence and cleaves at a non-base-paired region (RNA bulge) of the targeted RNA formed when the enzyme binds the RNA. This enzyme shows selectivity by cleaving only at one site that either does not have a mismatch or is kinetically preferred out of two possible cleavage sites.

== Nomenclature ==
Derivation of the EcoRI name
Abbreviation	Meaning	Description
E	Escherichia	genus
co	coli	specific species
R	RY13	strain
I	First identified	order of identification in the bacterium

Since their discovery in the 1970s, many restriction enzymes have been identified; for example, more than 3500 different Type II restriction enzymes have been characterized. Each enzyme is named after the bacterium from which it was isolated, using a naming system based on bacterial genus, species and strain. For example, the name of the EcoRI restriction enzyme was derived as shown in the box.

== Applications ==
Isolated restriction enzymes are used to manipulate DNA for different scientific applications.

They are used to assist insertion of genes into plasmid vectors during gene cloning and protein production experiments. For optimal use, plasmids that are commonly used for gene cloning are modified to include a short polylinker sequence (called the multiple cloning site, or MCS) rich in restriction recognition sequences. This allows flexibility when inserting gene fragments into the plasmid vector; restriction sites contained naturally within genes influence the choice of endonuclease for digesting the DNA, since it is necessary to avoid restriction of wanted DNA while intentionally cutting the ends of the DNA. To clone a gene fragment into a vector, both plasmid DNA and gene insert are typically cut with the same restriction enzymes, and then glued together with the assistance of an enzyme known as a DNA ligase.

Restriction enzymes can also be used to distinguish gene alleles by specifically recognizing single base changes in DNA known as single-nucleotide polymorphisms (SNPs). This is however only possible if a SNP alters the restriction site present in the allele. In this method, the restriction enzyme can be used to genotype a DNA sample without the need for expensive gene sequencing. The sample is first digested with the restriction enzyme to generate DNA fragments, and then the different sized fragments separated by gel electrophoresis. In general, alleles with correct restriction sites will generate two visible bands of DNA on the gel, and those with altered restriction sites will not be cut and will generate only a single band. A DNA map by restriction digest can also be generated that can give the relative positions of the genes. The different lengths of DNA generated by restriction digest also produce a specific pattern of bands after gel electrophoresis, and can be used for DNA fingerprinting.

In a similar manner, restriction enzymes are used to digest genomic DNA for gene analysis by Southern blot. This technique allows researchers to identify how many copies (or paralogues) of a gene are present in the genome of one individual, or how many gene mutations (polymorphisms) have occurred within a population. The latter example is called restriction fragment length polymorphism (RFLP).

Artificial restriction enzymes created by linking the FokI DNA cleavage domain with an array of DNA binding proteins or zinc finger arrays, denoted zinc finger nucleases (ZFN), are a powerful tool for host genome editing due to their enhanced sequence specificity. ZFN work in pairs, their dimerization being mediated in-situ through the FokI domain. Each zinc finger array (ZFA) is capable of recognizing 9–12 base pairs, making for 18–24 for the pair. A 5–7 bp spacer between the cleavage sites further enhances the specificity of ZFN, making them a safe and more precise tool that can be applied in humans. A recent Phase I clinical trial of ZFN for the targeted abolition of the CCR5 co-receptor for HIV-1 has been undertaken.

Others have proposed using the bacteria R-M system as a model for devising human anti-viral gene or genomic vaccines and therapies since the RM system serves an innate defense-role in bacteria by restricting tropism by bacteriophages. There is research on REases and ZFN that can cleave the DNA of various human viruses, including HSV-2, high-risk HPVs and HIV-1, with the ultimate goal of inducing target mutagenesis and aberrations of human-infecting viruses. The human genome already contains remnants of retroviral genomes that have been inactivated and harnessed for self-gain. Indeed, the mechanisms for silencing active L1 genomic retroelements by the three prime repair exonuclease 1 (TREX1) and excision repair cross-complementing 1(ERCC) appear to mimic the action of RM-systems in bacteria, and the non-homologous end-joining (NHEJ) that follows the use of ZFN without a repair template.

== Examples ==
Examples of restriction enzymes include:

Enzyme	Source	Recognition Sequence	Cut
EcoRI	Escherichia coli	5'GAATTC 3'CTTAAG	5'---G     AATTC---3' 3'---CTTAA     G---5'
EcoRII	Escherichia coli	5'CCWGG 3'GGWCC	5'---     CCWGG---3' 3'---GGWCC     ---5'
BamHI	Bacillus amyloliquefaciens	5'GGATCC 3'CCTAGG	5'---G     GATCC---3' 3'---CCTAG     G---5'
HindIII	Haemophilus influenzae	5'AAGCTT 3'TTCGAA	5'---A     AGCTT---3' 3'---TTCGA     A---5'
TaqI	Thermus aquaticus	5'TCGA 3'AGCT	5'---T   CGA---3' 3'---AGC   T---5'
NotI	Nocardia otitidis	5'GCGGCCGC 3'CGCCGGCG	5'---GC   GGCCGC---3' 3'---CGCCGG   CG---5'
HinFI	Haemophilus influenzae	5'GANTC 3'CTNAG	5'---G   ANTC---3' 3'---CTNA   G---5'
Sau3AI	Staphylococcus aureus	5'GATC 3'CTAG	5'---     GATC---3' 3'---CTAG     ---5'
PvuII*	Proteus vulgaris	5'CAGCTG 3'GTCGAC	5'---CAG  CTG---3' 3'---GTC  GAC---5'
SmaI*	Serratia marcescens	5'CCCGGG 3'GGGCCC	5'---CCC  GGG---3' 3'---GGG  CCC---5'
HaeIII*	Haemophilus aegyptius	5'GGCC 3'CCGG	5'---GG  CC---3' 3'---CC  GG---5'
HgaI	Haemophilus gallinarum	5'GACGC 3'CTGCG	5'---NN  NN---3' 3'---NN  NN---5'
AluI*	Arthrobacter luteus	5'AGCT 3'TCGA	5'---AG  CT---3' 3'---TC  GA---5'
EcoRV*	Escherichia coli	5'GATATC 3'CTATAG	5'---GAT  ATC---3' 3'---CTA  TAG---5'
EcoP15I	Escherichia coli	5'CAGCAGN25NN 3'GTCGTCN25NN	5'---CAGCAGN25   NN---3' 3'---GTCGTCN25NN   ---5'
KpnI	Klebsiella pneumoniae	5'GGTACC 3'CCATGG	5'---GGTAC  C---3' 3'---C  CATGG---5'
PstI	Providencia stuartii	5'CTGCAG 3'GACGTC	5'---CTGCA  G---3' 3'---G  ACGTC---5'
SacI	Streptomyces achromogenes	5'GAGCTC 3'CTCGAG	5'---GAGCT  C---3' 3'---C  TCGAG---5'
SalI	Streptomyces albus	5'GTCGAC 3'CAGCTG	5'---G  TCGAC---3' 3'---CAGCT  G---5'
ScaI*	Streptomyces caespitosus	5'AGTACT 3'TCATGA	5'---AGT  ACT---3' 3'---TCA  TGA---5'
SpeI	Sphaerotilus natans	5'ACTAGT 3'TGATCA	5'---A  CTAGT---3' 3'---TGATC  A---5'
SphI	Streptomyces phaeochromogenes	5'GCATGC 3'CGTACG	5'---GCATG  C---3' 3'---C  GTACG---5'
StuI*	Streptomyces tubercidicus	5'AGGCCT 3'TCCGGA	5'---AGG  CCT---3' 3'---TCC  GGA---5'
XbaI	Xanthomonas badrii	5'TCTAGA 3'AGATCT	5'---T  CTAGA---3' 3'---AGATC  T---5'

Key:
* = blunt ends
N = C or G or T or A
W = A or T

== See also ==
- BglII – A restriction enzyme
- EcoRI – A restriction enzyme
- HindIII – A restriction enzyme
- Homing endonuclease
- List of homing endonuclease cutting sites
- List of restriction enzyme cutting sites
- Molecular-weight size marker
- REBASE (database)
- Star activity
