= Sticky and blunt ends =

Ends of DNA molecules

DNA ends refer to the properties of the ends of linear DNA molecules, which in molecular biology are described as "sticky" or "blunt" based on the shape of the complementary strands at the terminus. In sticky ends, one strand is longer than the other (typically by at least a few nucleotides), such that the longer strand has bases which are left unpaired. In blunt ends, both strands are of equal length – i.e. they end at the same base position, leaving no unpaired bases on either strand.

The concept is used in molecular biology, in cloning, or when subcloning insert DNA into vector DNA. Such ends may be generated by restriction enzymes that break the molecule's phosphodiester backbone at specific locations, which themselves belong to a larger class of enzymes called exonucleases and endonucleases. A restriction enzyme that cuts the backbones of both strands at non-adjacent locations leaves a staggered cut, generating two overlapping sticky ends, while an enzyme that makes a straight cut (at locations directly across from each other on both strands) generates two blunt ends.

== Single-stranded DNA molecules ==
A single-stranded non-circular DNA molecule has two non-identical ends, the 3' end and the 5' end (usually pronounced "three prime end" and "five prime end"). The numbers refer to the numbering of carbon atoms in the deoxyribose, which is a sugar forming an important part of the backbone of the DNA molecule. In the backbone of DNA the 5' carbon of one deoxyribose is linked to the 3' carbon of another by a phosphodiester bond linkage.

== Variations in double-stranded molecules ==
When a molecule of DNA is double stranded, as DNA usually is, the two strands run in opposite directions. Therefore, one end of the molecule will have the 3' end of strand 1 and the 5' end of strand 2, and vice versa in the other end. However, the fact that the molecule is two stranded allows numerous different variations.

=== Blunt ends ===
The simplest DNA end of a double stranded molecule is called a blunt end. Blunt ends are also known as non-cohesive ends. In a blunt-ended molecule, both strands terminate in a base pair. Blunt ends are not always desired in biotechnology since when using a DNA ligase to join two molecules into one, the yield is significantly lower with blunt ends. When performing subcloning, it also has the disadvantage of potentially inserting the insert DNA in the opposite orientation desired. On the other hand, blunt ends are always compatible with each other. Here is an example of a small piece of blunt-ended DNA:

5'-GATCTGACTGATGCGTATGCTAGT-3'
3'-CTAGACTGACTACGCATACGATCA-5'

=== Overhangs and sticky ends ===
Non-blunt ends are created by various overhangs. An overhang is a stretch of unpaired nucleotides in the end of a DNA molecule. These unpaired nucleotides can be in either strand, creating either 3' or 5' overhangs. These overhangs are in most cases palindromic.

The simplest case of an overhang is a single nucleotide. This is most often adenine and is created as a 3' overhang by some DNA polymerases. Most commonly this is used in cloning PCR products created by such an enzyme. The product is joined with a linear DNA molecule with a 3' thymine overhang. Since adenine and thymine form a base pair, this facilitates the joining of the two molecules by a ligase, yielding a circular molecule. Here is an example of an A-overhang:

5'-ATCTGACTA-3'
3'-TAGACTGA -5'

Longer overhangs are called cohesive ends or sticky ends. They are most often created by restriction endonucleases when they cut DNA. Very often they cut the two DNA strands four base pairs from each other, creating a four-base 3' overhang in one molecule and a complementary 3' overhang in the other. These ends are called cohesive since they are easily joined back together by a ligase.

For example, these two "sticky" ends (four-base 5' overhangs) are compatible:

5'-ATCTGACT        GATGCGTATGCT-3'
3'-TAGACTGACTACG        CATACGA-5'

Also, since different restriction endonucleases usually create different overhangs, it is possible to create a plasmid by excising a piece of DNA (using a different enzyme for each end) and then joining it to another DNA molecule with ends trimmed by the same enzymes. Since the overhangs have to be complementary in order for the ligase to work, the two molecules can only join in one orientation. This is often highly desirable in molecular biology.

Sticky ends can be converted to blunt ends by a process known as blunting, which involves filling in the sticky end with complementary nucleotides. This yields a blunt end, however, sticky ends are often preferable, meaning the main use of this method is to label DNA by using radiolabeled nucleotides to fill the gap. Blunt ends can also be converted to sticky ends by addition of double-stranded linker sequences containing recognition sequences for restriction endonucleases that create sticky ends and subsequent application of the restriction enzyme or by homopolymer tailing, which refers to extending the molecule's 3' ends with only one nucleotide, allowing for specific pairing with the matching nucleotide (e.g. poly-C with poly-G).

=== Frayed ends ===
Across from each single strand of DNA, we typically see adenine pair with thymine, and cytosine pair with guanine to form a parallel complementary strand as described below. Two nucleotide sequences which correspond to each other in this manner are referred to as complementary:

5'-ATCTGACT-3'
3'-TAGACTGA-5'

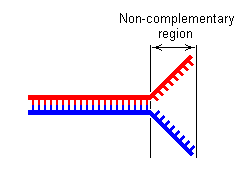

A frayed end refers to a region of a double stranded (or other multi-stranded) DNA molecule near the end with a significant proportion of non-complementary sequences; that is, a sequence where nucleotides on the adjacent strands do not match up correctly:

5'-ATCTGACTAGGCA-3'
3'-TAGACTGACTACG-5'

The term "frayed" is used because the incorrectly matched nucleotides tend to avoid bonding, thus appearing similar to the strands in a fraying piece of rope.

Although non-complementary sequences are also possible in the middle of double stranded DNA, mismatched regions away from the ends are not referred to as "frayed".

== Discovery ==
Ronald W. Davis first discovered sticky ends as the product of the action of EcoRI, the restriction endonuclease.

== Strength ==
Sticky end links are different in their stability. Free energy of formation can be measured to estimate stability. Free energy approximations can be made for different sequences from data related to oligonucleotide UV thermal denaturation curves. Also predictions from molecular dynamics simulations show that some sticky end links are much stronger in stretch than the others.
