= Ligation =

Ligation may refer to:

- Ligation (molecular biology), the covalent linking of two ends of DNA or RNA molecules
- Chemical ligation, the chemoselective condensation of unprotected peptides
- In medicine, the making of a ligature (tie)
- Tubal ligation, a method of female sterilization
- Rubber band ligation, a treatment for hemorrhoids
- In coordination chemistry, making a bond between a ligand and a Lewis acid
- In orthodontics, a method of attaching the archwires to the brackets
- KAHA Ligation
- Ligation-independent cloning
- Typographic ligature forming
