= List of homing endonuclease cutting sites =

Legend of nucleobases
Code	Nucleotide represented
A	Adenine (A)
C	Cytosine (C)
G	Guanine (G)
T	Thymine (T)
N	A, C, G or T
M	A or C
R	A or G
W	A or T
Y	C or T
S	C or G
K	G or T
H	A, C or T
B	C, G or T
V	A, C or G
D	A, G or T

The homing endonucleases are a special type of restriction enzymes encoded by introns or inteins. They act on the cellular DNA of the cell that synthesizes them; to be precise, in the opposite allele of the gene that encode them.

== Homing endonucleases ==
The list includes some of the most studied examples. The following concepts have been detailed:

- Enzyme: Accepted name of the molecule, according to the internationally adopted nomenclature. Bibliographical references. (Further reading: Homing endonuclease § Nomenclature.)
- SF (structural family): Any of the established families for this kind of proteins, based in their shared structural motifs: H1: LAGLIDADG family – H2: GIY-YIG family – H3: H-N-H family – H4: His-Cys box family – H5: PD-(D/E)xK – H6: EDxHD. (Further reading: Homing endonuclease § Structural families.)
- PDB code: Code used to identify the structure of a protein in the PDB database. If no structure is available, a UniProt identifier is given instead.
- Source: Organism that naturally produces the enzyme.
- D: Biological domain of the source: A: archaea – B: bacteria – E: eukarya.
- SCL: Subcellular genome: chloro: chloroplast – chrm: chromosomal – mito: mitochondrial – plasmid: other extrachromosomal – phage: bacteriophage.
- Recognition sequence: Sequence of DNA recognized by the enzyme. The enzyme is specifically bound to this sequence.
- Cut: Cutting site and products of the cut. Both the recognition sequence and the cutting site match usually, but sometimes the cutting site can be dozens of nucleotides away from the recognition site.

Enzyme	SF	PDB code	Source	D	SCL	Recognition sequence	Cut
I-AniI	H1	1P8K	Aspergillus nidulans	E	mito	5' TTGAGGAGGTTTCTCTGTAAATAA; 3' AACTCCTCCAAAGAGACATTTATT	5' ---TTGAGGAGGTTTC TCTGTAAATAA--- 3'; 3' ---AACTCCTCC AAAGAGACATTTATT--- 5'
I-CeuI	H1	2EX5	Chlamydomonas eugametos	E	chloro	5' TAACTATAACGGTCCTAAGGTAGCGA; 3' ATTGATATTGCCAGGATTCCATCGCT	5' ---TAACTATAACGGTCCTAA GGTAGCGA--- 3'; 3' ---ATTGATATTGCCAG GATTCCATCGCT--- 5'
I-ChuI	H1	Q32001	Chlamydomonas humicola	E	chloro	5' GAAGGTTTGGCACCTCGATGTCGGCTCATC; 3' CTTCCAAACCGTGGAGCTACAGCCGAGTAG	5' ---GAAGGTTTGGCACCTCG ATGTCGGCTCATC--- 3'; 3' ---CTTCCAAACCGTG GAGCTACAGCCGAGTAG--- 5'
I-CpaI	H1	Q39562	Chlamydomonas pallidostigmata	E	chloro	5' CGATCCTAAGGTAGCGAAATTCA; 3' GCTAGGATTCCATCGCTTTAAGT	5' ---CGATCCTAAGGTAGCGAA ATTCA--- 3'; 3' ---GCTAGGATTCCATC GCTTTAAGT--- 5'
I-CpaII	H1	Q39559	Chlamydomonas pallidostigmata	E	chloro	5' CCCGGCTAACTCTGTGCCAG; 3' GGGCCGATTGAGACACGGTC	5' ---CCCGGCTAACTC TGTGCCAG--- 3'; 5' ---GGGCCGAT TGAGACACGGTC--- 3'
I-CreI	H1	1BP7	Chlamydomonas reinhardtii	E	chloro	5' CTGGGTTCAAAACGTCGTGAGACAGTTTGG; 3' GACCCAAGTTTTGCAGCACTCTGTCAAACC	5' ---CTGGGTTCAAAACGTCGTGA GACAGTTTGG--- 3'; 3' ---GACCCAAGTTTTGCAG CACTCTGTCAAACC--- 5'
I-DmoI	H1	1B24	Desulfurococcus mobilis	A	chrm	5' ATGCCTTGCCGGGTAAGTTCCGGCGCGCAT; 3' TACGGAACGGCCCATTCAAGGCCGCGCGTA	5' ---ATGCCTTGCCGGGTAA GTTCCGGCGCGCAT--- 3'; 3' ---TACGGAACGGCC CATTCAAGGCCGCGCGTA--- 5'
H-DreI	H1	1MOW	Hybrid: I-DmoI and I-CreI	AE		5' CAAAACGTCGTAAGTTCCGGCGCG; 3' GTTTTGCAGCATTCAAGGCCGCGC	5' ---CAAAACGTCGTAA GTTCCGGCGCG--- 3'; 3' ---GTTTTGCAG CATTCAAGGCCGCGC--- 5'
I-HmuI	H3	1U3E	Bacillus subtilis phage SP01	B	phage	5' AGTAATGAGCCTAACGCTCAGCAA; 3' TCATTACTCGGATTGCGAGTCGTT	Nicking endonuclease: * 3' ---TCATTACTCGGATTGC GAGTCGTT--- 5'
I-HmuII	H3	Q38137	Bacillus subtilis phage SP82	B	phage	5' AGTAATGAGCCTAACGCTCAACAA; 3' TCATTACTCGGATTGCGAGTTGTT	Nicking endonuclease: * 3' ---TCATTACTCGGATTGCGAGTTGTTN_{35} NNNN--- 5'
I-LlaI	H3	P0A3U1	Lactococcus lactis	B	chrm	5' CACATCCATAACCATATCATTTTT; 3' GTGTAGGTATTGGTATAGTAAAAA	5' ---CACATCCATAA CCATATCATTTTT--- 3'; 3' ---GTGTAGGTATTGGTATAGTAA AAA--- 5'
I-MsoI	H1	1M5X	Monomastix sp.	E		5' CTGGGTTCAAAACGTCGTGAGACAGTTTGG; 3' GACCCAAGTTTTGCAGCACTCTGTCAAACC	5' ---CTGGGTTCAAAACGTCGTGA GACAGTTTGG--- 3'; 3' ---GACCCAAGTTTTGCAG CACTCTGTCAAACC--- 5'
PI-PfuI	H1	1DQ3	Pyrococcus furiosus Vc1	A		5' GAAGATGGGAGGAGGGACCGGACTCAACTT; 3' CTTCTACCCTCCTCCCTGGCCTGAGTTGAA	5' ---GAAGATGGGAGGAGGG ACCGGACTCAACTT--- 3'; 3' ---CTTCTACCCTCC TCCCTGGCCTGAGTTGAA--- 5'
PI-PkoII	H1	2CW7	Pyrococcus kodakarensis BAA-918	A		5' CAGTACTACGGTTAC; 3' GTCATGATGCCAATG	5' ---CAGTACTACG GTTAC--- 3'; 3' ---GTCATG ATGCCAATG--- 5'
I-PorI	H3		Pyrobaculum organotrophum	A	chrm	5' GCGAGCCCGTAAGGGTGTGTACGGG; 3' CGCTCGGGCATTCCCACACATGCCC	5' ---GCGAGCCCGTAAGGGT GTGTACGGG--- 3'; 3' ---CGCTCGGGCATT CCCACACATGCCC--- 5'
I-PpoI	H4	1EVX	Physarum polycephalum	E	plasmid	5' TAACTATGACTCTCTTAAGGTAGCCAAAT; 3' ATTGATACTGAGAGAATTCCATCGGTTTA	5' ---TAACTATGACTCTCTTAA GGTAGCCAAAT--- 3'; 3' ---ATTGATACTGAGAG AATTCCATCGGTTTA--- 5'
PI-PspI	H1	Q51334	Pyrococcus sp.	A	chrm	5' TGGCAAACAGCTATTATGGGTATTATGGGT; 3' ACCGTTTGTCGATAATACCCATAATACCCA	5' ---TGGCAAACAGCTATTAT GGGTATTATGGGT--- 3'; 3' ---ACCGTTTGTCGAT AATACCCATAATACCCA--- 5'
I-ScaI	H1	P03873	Saccharomyces capensis	E	mito	5' TGTCACATTGAGGTGCACTAGTTATTAC; 3' ACAGTGTAACTCCACGTGATCAATAATG	5' ---TGTCACATTGAGGTGCACT AGTTATTAC--- 3'; 3' ---ACAGTGTAACTCCAC GTGATCAATAATG--- 5'
I-SceI	H1	1R7M	Saccharomyces cerevisiae	E	mito	5' AGTTACGCTAGGGATAACAGGGTAATATAG; 3' TCAATGCGATCCCTATTGTCCCATTATATC	5' ---AGTTACGCTAGGGATAA CAGGGTAATATAG--- 3'; 3' ---TCAATGCGATCCC TATTGTCCCATTATATC--- 5'
PI-SceI	H1	1VDE	Saccharomyces cerevisiae	E		5' ATCTATGTCGGGTGCGGAGAAAGAGGTAATGAAATGGCA; 3' TAGATACAGCCCACGCCTCTTTCTCCATTACTTTACCGT	5' ---ATCTATGTCGGGTGC GGAGAAAGAGGTAATGAAATGGCA--- 3'; 3' ---TAGATACAGCC CACGCCTCTTTCTCCATTACTTTACCGT--- 5'
I-SceII	H1		Saccharomyces cerevisiae	E	mito	5' TTTTGATTCTTTGGTCACCCTGAAGTATA; 3' AAAACTAAGAAACCAGTGGGACTTCATAT	5' ---TTTTGATTCTTTGGTCACCC TGAAGTATA--- 3'; 3' ---AAAACTAAGAAACCAG TGGGACTTCATAT--- 5'
I-SecIII	H1		Saccharomyces cerevisiae	E	mito	5' ATTGGAGGTTTTGGTAACTATTTATTACC; 3' TAACCTCCAAAACCATTGATAAATAATGG	5' ---ATTGGAGGTTTTGGTAAC TATTTATTACC--- 3'; 3' ---TAACCTCCAAAACC ATTGATAAATAATGG--- 5'
I-SceIV	H1		Saccharomyces cerevisiae	E	mito	5' TCTTTTCTCTTGATTAGCCCTAATCTACG; 3' AGAAAAGAGAACTAATCGGGATTAGATGC	5' ---TCTTTTCTCTTGATTA GCCCTAATCTACG--- 3'; 3' ---AGAAAAGAGAAC TAATCGGGATTAGATGC--- 5'
I-SceV	H3		Saccharomyces cerevisiae	E	mito	5' AATAATTTTCTTCTTAGTAATGCC; 3' TTATTAAAAGAAGAATCATTACGG	5' ---AATAATTTTCT TCTTAGTAATGCC--- 3'; 3' ---TTATTAAAAGAAGAATCATTA CGG--- 5'
I-SceVI	H3		Saccharomyces cerevisiae	E	mito	5' GTTATTTAATGTTTTAGTAGTTGG; 3' CAATAAATTACAAAATCATCAACC	5' ---GTTATTTAATG TTTTAGTAGTTGG--- 3'; 3' ---CAATAAATTACAAAATCATCA ACC--- 5'
I-SceVII	H1		Saccharomyces cerevisiae	E	mito	5' TGTCACATTGAGGTGCACTAGTTATTAC; 3' ACAGTGTAACTCCACGTGATCAATAATG	Unknown **
I-Ssp6803I	H5	2OST	Synechocystis sp. PCC 6803	B		5' GTCGGGCTCATAACCCGAA; 3' CAGCCCGAGTATTGGGCTT	5' ---GTCGGGCT CATAACCCGAA--- 3'; 3' ---CAGCCCGAGTA TTGGGCTT--- 5'
I-TevI	H2	1I3J	Escherichia coli phage T4	B	phage	5' AGTGGTATCAACGCTCAGTAGATG; 3' TCACCATAGT TGCGAGTCATCTAC	5' ---AGTGGTATCAAC GCTCAGTAGATG--- 3'; 3' ---TCACCATAGT TGCGAGTCATCTAC--- 5'
I-TevII	H2		Escherichia coli phage T4	B	phage	5' GCTTATGAGTATGAAGTGAACACGTTATTC; 3' CGAATACTCATACTTCACTTGTGCAATAAG	5' ---GCTTATGAGTATGAAGTGAACACGT TATTC--- 3'; 3' ---CGAATACTCATACTTCACTTGTG CAATAAG--- 5'
I-TevIII	H3		Escherichia coli phage RB3	B	phage	5' TATGTATCTTTTGCGTGTACCTTTAACTTC; 3' ATACATAGAAAACGCACATGGAAATTGAAG	5' ---T ATGTATCTTTTGCGTGTACCTTTAACTTC--- 3'; 3' ---AT ACATAGAAAACGCACATGGAAATTGAAG--- 5'
PI-TliI	H1		Thermococcus litoralis	A	chrm	5' TAYGCNGAYACNGACGGYTTYT; 3' ATRCGNCTRTGNCTGCCTAARA	5' ---TAYGCNGAYACNGACGG YTTYT--- 3'; 3' ---ATRCGNCTRTGNC TGCCTAARA--- 5'
PI-TliII	H1		Thermococcus litoralis	A	chrm	5' AAATTGCTTGCAAACAGCTATTACGGCTAT; 3' TTTAACGAACGTTTGTCGATAATGCCGATA	Unknown **
I-Tsp061I	H1	2DCH	Thermoproteus sp. IC-061	A		5' CTTCAGTATGCCCCGAAAC; 3' GAAGTCATACGGGGCTTTG	5' ---CTTCAGTAT GCCCCGAAAC--- 3'; 3' ---GAAGT CATACGGGGCTTTG--- 5'
I-Vdi141I	H1	3E54	Vulcanisaeta distributa IC-141	A		5' CCTGACTCTCTTAAGGTAGCCAAA; 3' GGACTGAGAGAATTCCATCGGTTT	5' ---CCTGACTCTCTTAA GGTAGCCAAA--- 3'; 3' ---GGACTGAG AGAATTCCATCGGTTT--- 5'

*: Nicking endonuclease: These enzymes cut only one DNA strand, leaving the other strand untouched.
**: Unknown cutting site: Researchers have not been able to determine the exact cutting site of these enzymes yet.

== See also ==
- List of restriction enzyme cutting sites.
- Homing endonuclease.
- Restriction enzyme.
- Introns and inteins.
- Intragenomic conflict: Homing endonuclease genes.
- I-CreI homing endonuclease.
- Isoschizomer.
- Detailed articles about certain restriction enzymes: EcoRI, HindIII, BglII.

== Information sources ==
Databases and lists of restriction enzymes:

- Very comprehensive database of restriction enzymes supported by New England Biolabs. It includes all kind of biological, structural, kinetical and commercial information about thousands of enzymes. Also includes related literature for every molecule: Roberts RJ, Vincze T, Posfai J, Macelis D. "REBASE". "Restriction Enzyme Database."
- Database of inteins, hosted by New England Biolabs. Perler FB. "InBase". Archived from the original on 2010-08-02. "The Intein Database and Registry".
- Detailed information for biochemical experiments: "Enzyme finder". Archived from the original on 2010-01-08. "New England Biolabs enzyme finder."
- Alphabetical list of enzymes and their restriction sites: "GenScript Restriction Enzyme webpage". Archived from the original on 2009-07-04.
- General information about restriction sites and biochemical conditions for restriction reactions: "Restriction Enzymes Resource". Archived from the original on 2002-02-03. "Promega restriction enzymes webpage."

Databases of proteins:

- Database of protein structures, solved at atomic resolution: "PDB". Research Collaboratory for Structural Bioinformatics (RCSB). Archived from the original on 2015-04-07. "RCSB Protein Data Bank."
- Databases of proteins: Swiss Institute of Bioinformatics (SIB); European Bioinformatics Institute (EBI). "UniProtKB/Swiss-Prot & TrEMBL". "Swiss-Prot is a curated protein sequence database which strives to provide a high level of annotation (such as the description of the function of a protein, its domains structure, post-translational modifications, variants, etc.), a minimal level of redundancy and high level of integration with other databases. TrEMBL is a computer-annotated supplement of Swiss-Prot that contains all the translations of EMBL nucleotide sequence entries not yet integrated in Swiss-Prot."
