= Stephen Kent (chemist) =

American chemist

Stephen B. H. Kent (born December 12, 1945, Wellington, New Zealand). Stephen Kent is best known for establishing the field of modern chemical protein synthesis. At The Scripps Research Institute in the early 1990s he introduced the chemical ligation concept: condensation of unprotected peptides, for the total synthesis of protein molecules. With his student Philip Dawson, he developed the native chemical ligation reaction for the covalent condensation of unprotected peptide chains linked by native peptide bonds Kent pioneered the study of mirror image protein molecules. His laboratory experimentally demonstrated that chemical synthesis of a protein's polypeptide chain using mirror-image D-amino acids, after folding results in a mirror-image D-protein molecule which, if the D-protein is an enzyme, will catalyze a chemical reaction with mirror-image stereospecificity. Kent was the inventor of mirror image drug discovery, the use of mirror image protein targets to discover novel chiral drug leads, and his laboratory pioneered the systematic development of D-protein molecules as candidate therapeutics. At the University of Chicago, Kent and his junior colleagues pioneered the elucidation of novel protein structures by quasi-racemic & racemic crystallography .

== Biography ==
Stephen Kent received his chemistry Ph.D. from the University of California, Berkeley in 1975, his M.Sc. from Massey University, Palmerston North, New Zealand in 1970, and his B.Sc. degree in 1968 from Victoria University of Wellington, New Zealand.

Following post-doctoral work in the laboratory of Robert Bruce Merrifield at the Rockefeller University, Stephen Kent continued research there as an assistant professor through 1981. He has also held faculty positions at the California Institute of Technology, Bond University in Australia, and The Scripps Research Institute in California. Currently, Stephen Kent is Professor Emeritus of Biochemistry and Molecular Biology and Professor Emeritus of Chemistry at the University of Chicago, where from 2003-2009 he served as Director of the Institute for Biophysical Dynamics. In addition to his academic achievements, in the 1990s Kent was the founder of two San Francisco Bay Area biotech companies: Ciphergen Biosytems and Gryphon Sciences.

Stephen Kent has received international recognition for his research achievements. He received the Hirschmann Award in Peptide Chemistry from the American Chemical Societyin 1994, the (inaugural) Kaiser Award from the Protein Society in 2002, the du Vigneaud Award from the American Peptide Society (2004), the 2009 Merrifield award from the American Peptide Society, the Rudinger Medal from the European Peptide Society (2010), the Akabori Medal from the Japanese Peptide Society (2010), the Bader Award in Bioorganic Chemistry (2011) from the American Chemical Society, the Leach Medal from the Lorne Protein Conference (2013), the Prelog Medal from the ETH Zurich (2017), the (inaugural) Scoffone Award from the Italian Peptide Society (2018), and the Meienhofer Award of the Boulder Peptide Society (2022). Dr. Kent is Honorary Fellow of the Royal Society of New Zealand. He was elected Fellow of the American Association for the Advancement of Science in 2000, and Fellow of the Royal Society of Chemistry in 2008.

In May 2016 the Journal of Peptide Science, edited by Luis_Moroder, published a Festschrift in celebration of Stephen Kent's 70th birthday.

In 2022, Stephen Kent's scientific autobiography was published as the first English language contribution to the book series Lives-in-Chemistry; this series is steered by an Advisory Board appointed by the Executive Committee of the Fachgruppe Geschichte der Chemie (History of Chemistry Division) of the Gesellschaft Deutscher Chemiker (GDCh).
