= Meganuclease =

Meganucleases are endodeoxyribonucleases characterized by a large recognition site (double-stranded DNA sequences of 12 to 40 base pairs); as a result this site generally occurs only once in any given genome. For example, the 18-base pair sequence recognized by the I-SceI meganuclease would on average require a genome twenty times the size of the human genome to be found once by chance (although sequences with a single mismatch occur about three times per human-sized genome). Meganucleases are therefore considered to be the most specific naturally occurring restriction enzymes.

Among meganucleases, the LAGLIDADG family of homing endonucleases has become a valuable tool for the study of genomes and genome engineering over the past fifteen years. Meganucleases are "molecular DNA scissors" that can be used to replace, eliminate or modify sequences in a highly targeted way. By modifying their recognition sequence through protein engineering, the targeted sequence can be changed. Meganucleases are used to modify all genome types, whether bacterial, plant or animal. They open up wide avenues for innovation, particularly in the field of human health, for example the elimination of viral genetic material or the "repair" of damaged genes using gene therapy.

== Two main families ==
Meganucleases are found in a large number of organisms – Archaea or archaebacteria, bacteria, phages, fungi, yeast, algae and some plants. They can be expressed in different compartments of the cell – the nucleus, mitochondria or chloroplasts. Several hundred of these enzymes have been identified.

Meganucleases are mainly represented by two main enzyme families collectively known as homing endonucleases: intron endonucleases and intein endonucleases.

In nature, these proteins are encoded by mobile genetic elements, introns or inteins. Introns propagate by intervening at a precise location in the DNA, where the expression of the meganuclease produces a break in the complementary intron- or intein-free allele. For inteins and group I introns, this break leads to the duplication of the intron or intein at the cutting site by means of the homologous recombination repair for double-stranded DNA breaks.

We know relatively little about the actual purpose of meganucleases. It is widely thought that the genetic material that encodes meganucleases functions as a parasitic element that uses the double-stranded DNA cell repair mechanisms to its own advantage as a means of multiplying and spreading, without damaging the genetic material of its host.

== Homing endonucleases from the LAGLIDADG family ==
There are five families, or classes, of homing endonucleases. The most widespread and best known is the LAGLIDADG family. LAGLIDADG family endonucleases are mostly found in the mitochondria and chloroplasts of eukaryotic unicellular organisms.

The name of this family corresponds to an amino acid sequence (or motif) that is found, more or less conserved, in all the proteins of this family. These small proteins are also known for their compact and closely packed three-dimensional structures.

The best characterized endonucleases which are most widely used in research and genome engineering include I-SceI (discovered in the mitochondria of baker's yeast Saccharomyces cerevisiae), I-CreI (from the chloroplasts of the green algae Chlamydomonas reinhardtii) and I-DmoI (from the archaebacterium Desulfurococcus mobilis).

The best known LAGLIDADG endonucleases are homodimers (for example I-CreI, composed of two copies of the same protein domain) or internally symmetrical monomers (I-SceI). The DNA binding site, which contains the catalytic domain, is composed of two parts on either side of the cutting point. The half-binding sites can be extremely similar and bind to a palindromic or semi-palindromic DNA sequence (I-CreI), or they can be non-palindromic (I-SceI).

== As tools for genome engineering ==
The high specificity of meganucleases gives them a high degree of precision and much lower cell toxicity than other naturally occurring restriction enzymes. Meganucleases were identified in the 1990s, and subsequent work has shown that they are particularly promising tools for genome engineering and gene editing, as they are able to efficiently induce homologous recombination, generate mutations, and alter reading frames.

However, the meganuclease-induced genetic recombinations that could be performed were limited by the repertoire of meganucleases available. Despite the existence of hundreds of meganucleases in nature, and the fact that each one is able to tolerate minor variations in its recognition site, the probability of finding a meganuclease able to cut a given gene at the desired location is extremely slim. Several groups turned their attention to engineering new meganucleases that would target the desired recognition sites.

The most advanced research and applications concern homing endonucleases from the LAGLIDADG family.

To create tailor-made meganucleases, two main approaches have been adopted:

- Modifying the specificity of existing meganucleases by introducing a small number of variations to the amino acid sequence and then selecting the functional proteins on variations of the natural recognition site.
- A more radical option has been to exploit a property that plays an important role in meganucleases' naturally high degree of diversification: the possibility of associating or fusing protein domains from different enzymes. This option makes it possible to develop chimeric meganucleases with a new recognition site composed of a half-site of meganuclease A and a half-site of protein B. By fusing the protein domains of I-DmoI and I-CreI, two chimeric meganucleases have been created using this method: E-Drel and DmoCre.

These two approaches can be combined to increase the possibility of creating new enzymes, while maintaining a high degree of efficacy and specificity. The scientists from Cellectis have been working on gene editing since 1999 and have developed a collection of over 20,000 protein domains from the homodimeric meganuclease I-CreI as well as from other meganucleases scaffolds. They can be combined to form functional chimeric tailor-made heterodimers for research laboratories and for industrial purposes.

Precision Biosciences, another biotechnology company, has developed a fully rational design process called Directed Nuclease Editor (DNE) which is capable of creating engineered meganucleases that target and modify a user-defined location in a genome. In 2012 researchers at Bayer CropScience used DNE to incorporate a gene sequence into the DNA of cotton plants, targeting it precisely to a predetermined site.

=== Additional applications ===
One recent advance in the use of meganucleases for genome engineering is the incorporation of the DNA binding domain from transcription activator-like (TAL) effectors into hybrid nucleases. These "megaTALs" combine the ease of engineering and high DNA binding specificity of a TAL effector with the high cleavage efficiency of meganucleases. In addition, meganucleases have been fused to DNA end-processing enzymes in order to promote error-prone non-homologous end joining and to increase the frequency of mutagenic events at a given locus.

== Probabilities ==
As stated in the opening paragraph, a meganuclease with an 18-base pair sequence would on average require a genome twenty times the size of the human genome to be found once by chance; the calculation is 4^{18}/(3 × 10^{9}) = 22.9. However, very similar sequences are much more common, with frequency increasing quickly the more mismatches are permitted.

For example, a sequence that is identical in all but one base pair would occur by chance once every 4^{17}/(18 × 3 × 10^{9}) = 0.32 human genome equivalents on average, or three times per human genome. A sequence that is identical in all but two base pairs would on average occur by chance once every 4^{16}/((18C2) × 3 × 10^{9}) = 0.0094 human genome equivalents, or 107 times per human genome.

This is important because enzymes do not have perfect discrimination; a nuclease will still have some likelihood of acting even if the sequence does not match perfectly. So the activity of the nuclease on a sequence with one mismatch is less than the no-mismatch case, and activity is even less for two mismatches, but still not zero. Exclusion of these sequences, which are very similar but not identical, is still an important problem to be overcome in genome engineering.

== Other considerations ==
DNA methylation and chromatin structure affect the efficacy of meganuclease digestion. A thorough consideration of the genetic and epigenetic context of a target sequence is therefore necessary for the practical application of these enzymes.

In December 2014, the USPTO issued patent 8,921,332 covering meganuclease-based genome editing in vitro. This patent was licensed exclusively to Cellectis.

== See also ==
- Homing endonuclease
- homologous recombination
- I-CreI
- Protein engineering
- Protein design
- Genome editing with engineered nucleases
- Genome engineering
- Genetic engineering
