= Lenny Seligman =

American biologist

Maurice Leonard Seligman is an American molecular geneticist. He is the John P. and Magdalena R. Dexter Professor of Biology at Pomona College in Claremont, California. His work focuses on engineering homing endonucleases.

== Early life ==
Seligman completed his undergraduate work at the University of California, San Diego, before earning his doctorate at the University of Washington. He then completed a National Science Foundation Graduate Fellowship in 1987.

== Career ==
Seligman began teaching at Pomona College in 1996. He is currently the John P. and Magdalena R. Dexter Professor of Biology. His work focuses on engineering homing endonucleases.

In 2013, Seligman was called as an expert witness in a biotechnology patent lawsuit between French firm Cellectis and Precision BioSciences, a smaller American firm. Both firms had developed technology building upon his lab's work in genetic engineering. He testified for Precision BioSciences, which ultimately won the case.

== Recognition ==
In 2000, Seligman won Pomona's Wig Distinguished Professor Award, the college's highest faculty honor, in recognition of his teaching. In 2016, he received a Claremont Colleges diversity and inclusion award.
