= D-amino-acid N-acetyltransferase =

Identifiers
- EC no.: 2.3.1.36
- CAS no.: 37257-15-1

Databases
- IntEnz: IntEnz view
- BRENDA: BRENDA entry
- ExPASy: NiceZyme view
- KEGG: KEGG entry
- MetaCyc: metabolic pathway
- PRIAM: profile
- PDB structures: RCSB PDB PDBe PDBsum
- Gene Ontology: AmiGO / QuickGO
Search
- PMC: articles
- PubMed: articles
- NCBI: proteins

In enzymology, a D-amino-acid N-acetyltransferase (EC 2.3.1.36) is an enzyme that catalyzes the chemical reaction

acetyl-CoA + a D-amino acid $\rightleftharpoons$ CoA + an N-acetyl-D-amino acid

Thus, the two substrates of this enzyme are acetyl-CoA and D-amino acid, whereas its two products are CoA and N-acetyl-D-amino acid.

This enzyme belongs to the family of transferases, specifically those acyltransferases transferring groups other than aminoacyl groups. The systematic name of this enzyme class is acetyl-CoA:D-amino-acid N-acetyltransferase. Other names in common use include D-amino acid acetyltransferase, and D-amino acid-alpha-N-acetyltransferase. This enzyme participates in phenylalanine metabolism.
