= Stephen Kent =

Stephen, Steven, or Steve Kent may refer to:

- Stephen Kent (musician), didgeridoo/ambient musician
- Stephen Kent (network security) (born 1951), American pioneer of network security systems, recipient of Internet Hall of Fame
- Stephen A. Kent, Canadian religious scholar
- Stephen Kent (chemist) (born 1945), University of Chicago chemist
- Steven Kent (television producer), American television writer and producer
- Steven Kent (swimmer) (born 1988), New Zealand swimmer
- Steven Kent (baseball) (born 1989), Australian professional baseball player
- Steven L. Kent (born 1960), American author and reporter known for his coverage of video games
- Steve Kent (politician) (born 1978), Canadian politician, member of the Newfoundland and Labrador House of Assembly for Mount Pearl North
- Steve Kent (baseball) (born 1978), German-born baseball player
- Steve Kent (Home and Away), fictional character on the Australian soap opera Home and Away
- Stephen Kent (astronomer), American astronomer and discoverer of minor planets
