= SEA Native Peptide Ligation =

Protein chemical synthesis by native peptide ligation of unprotected peptide segments is an interesting complement and potential alternative to the use of living systems for producing proteins. The synthesis of proteins requires efficient native peptide ligation methods, which enable the chemoselective formation of a native peptide bond in aqueous solution between unprotected peptide segments. The most frequently used technique for synthesizing proteins is Native chemical ligation (NCL). However, alternatives are emerging, one of which is SEA Native Peptide Ligation.

== Overview ==
The SEA group belongs to the N,S-acyl shift systems because its reactivity is dictated by the intramolecular nucleophilic addition of one SEA thiol group on the C-terminal carbonyl group of the peptide segment. This results in the migration of the peptide chain from the nitrogen to the sulfur. The overall process of SEA native peptide ligation involves first an N,S-acyl shift for in in situ formation of a peptide thioester, and later on, after thiol-thioester exchange, an S,N-acyl shift for formation of the peptide bond.

== Description of the reaction ==
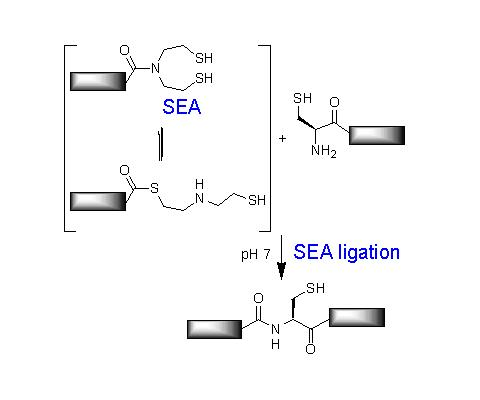
Scheme 1. SEA ligation between a bis(2-sulfanylethyl)amino (SEA) peptide and a cysteinyl or homocysteinyl peptide leads to the chemoselective and regioselective formation of a native peptide bond.

SEA is an abbreviation of bis(2-sulfanylethyl)amido (Scheme 1). SEA ligation involves the reaction of a peptide featuring a C-terminal bis(2-sulfanylethyl)amido group with a Cys peptide. This reaction proceeds probably through the formation of a transient thioester intermediate, obtained by intramolecular attack of one SEA thiol on the peptide C-terminal carbonyl group as shown in Scheme 1. Then, the thioester undergoes a series of thiol-thioester exchanges, including with exogeneous thiols present in the ligation mixture such as mercaptophenyl acetic acid (MPAA). Exchange with the cysteine thiol group of the second peptide segment results in a transient thioester intermediate, which as for Native Chemical Ligation, rearranges by intramolecular S,N-acyl shift migration into a native peptide bond.

== Publication ==
The first peer reviewed publication describing SEA native peptide ligation was published in Organic Letters by Melnyk, O. et al. (Ollivier, N.; Dheur, J.; Mhidia, R.; Blanpain, A.; Melnyk, O., Bis(2-sulfanylethyl)amino native peptide ligation. Org. Lett. 2010, 12, (22), 5238–41; Publication Date (Web): October 21, 2010.

A few weeks later, the same reaction was published in the same journal by Liu, C. F (Hou, W.; Zhang, X.; Li, F.; Liu, C. F., Peptidyl N,N-Bis(2-mercaptoethyl)-amides as Thioester Precursors for Native Chemical Ligation. Org. Lett. 2011, 13, 386–389; Publication Date (Web): December 22, 2010).

== SEA on/off concept ==
SEA ^{on/off} concept exploits the redox properties of SEA group. Oxidation of SEA ^{on} results in a cyclic disulfide called SEA ^{off}, which is a self-protected form of SEA ^{on}. SEA ^{off} and SEA ^{on} can be easily interconverted by reduction/oxidation as shown in Scheme 2.
