= Precision BioSciences =

American gene editing company

Precision BioSciences, Inc.
- Type: Public
- Traded as: Nasdaq: DTIL
- Industry: Biotechnology; Genome engineering; Pharmaceutical
- Founded: 2006; 20 years ago in Durham, North Carolina
- Founders: Derek Jantz; Jeff Smith; Matt Kane
- Key people: Michael Amoroso (president and CEO)
- Revenue: $115.5 million
- Number of employees: 192 (2022)
- Website: precisionbiosciences.com

Precision BioSciences, Inc. is a publicly traded American clinical stage gene editing company headquartered in Durham, North Carolina. Founded in 2006, Precision is focused on developing both in vivo and ex vivo gene editing therapies using its proprietary "ARCUS" genome editing platform.

== History ==
Derek Jantz and Jeff Smith met as postdoctoral fellows at Duke University, and in March 2006, they founded Precision BioSciences along with Matt Kane, a student at the Duke Fuqua School of Business at the time. The company went through two rounds of early funding: a Series A round led by venBio to fund development of the genome editing platform, and Series B financing to fund product development efforts. The company completed its initial public offering in 2019, and trades under the Nasdaq ticker DTIL.

Precision entered into a partnership with Eli Lilly in November 2020 to use ARCUS editing for up to six in vivo targets connected to genetic disorders, beginning with Duchenne muscular dystrophy. In September 2021, Precision announced two more collaborations, with UK biotechnology company Tiziana Life Sciences to explore using foralumab to aid chimeric antigen receptor (CAR) T cell therapy, and with Philadelphia-based iECURE to advance candidates into clinical trials and investigate how ARCUS can help treat liver diseases. Michael Amoroso, the former CEO of cell and gene therapy developer Abeona Therapeutics, succeeded Matt Kane as President and CEO in October 2021. That December, Precision announced its entry into an agreement with a syndicate of investors led by ACCELR8 to spin off its subsidiary, Elo Life Systems, and create an independent company focused on food and agriculture business.

== ARCUS genome editing ==
Precision BioSciences' proprietary technology is the ARCUS platform and ARCUS nucleases. ARCUS nucleases are based on a naturally occurring genome editing enzyme, I-CreI, a homing endonuclease that evolved in the algae Chlamydomonas reinhardtii to make highly specific cuts and DNA insertions in cellular DNA. The nuclease is able to deactivate itself once gene edits are made, which minimizes potential off-targeting. An ARCUS nuclease is also much smaller in size than CRISPR spCas9. It can use either adeno-associated virus (AAV) vectors or lipid nanoparticles (LNPs) for delivery to specific tissues and cells. Precision has used ARCUS nucleases to develop multiple ex vivo allogeneic, "off-the-shelf" CAR T cell immunotherapies in early-stage clinical trials. The company also uses ARCUS for in vivo gene editing programs, some of which are in preclinical development as of May 2022.

Similar to I-CreI, ARCUS nucleases generate a unique cleavage site in DNA that is characterized by four-base-pair, 3' overhangs. ARCUS nucleases can perform a range of complex edits, including gene insertion, gene excision, and gene repair. ARCUS nucleases are able to enact all editing operations in one step, which enables efficient multiplexing of edits.

Precision has demonstrated some additional applications of the ARCUS platform, including treating ornithine transcarbamylase deficiency in newborn nonhuman primates and in the use of a LNP to treat chronic Hepatitis B. The company is also pursuing PBGENE-PCSK9, a candidate to treat familial hypercholesterolemia, and PBGENE-PH1, a candidate to treat primary hyperoxaluria type 1.

== Clinical trials ==
Precision is in the process of developing multiple candidates targeting non-Hodgkin lymphoma, acute lymphoblastic leukemia (ALL), and multiple myeloma. The company's lead candidate targeting CD19, PBCAR0191, received orphan drug designation from the U.S. Food and Drug Administration for the treatment of ALL and mantle cell lymphoma, an aggressive subtype of non-Hodgkin lymphoma, as well as fast track designation for the treatment of B-cell ALL. PBCAR0191 began its Phase 1/2a clinical trial of adult subjects in March 2019. In June 2022, Precision reported a 100% response rate, a 73% complete response rate, and a 50% durable response rate, and the company sought to increase enrollment in the study.

Precision is also developing PBCAR19B as an anti-CD19 stealth cell candidate that employs a single gene edit to knock down beta-2 microglobulin, for which a Phase 1 study began in June 2021. The company is also conducting a Phase 1/2a clinical trial evaluating PBCAR269A, its investigational allogeneic B-cell maturation antigen-targeted CAR T cell therapy, for the treatment of multiple myleloma. PBCAR269A began its Phase 1 trials in April 2020, and as of July 2022 had moved onto recruitment for its Phase 1/2a study, which features PBCAR269A in combination with nirogacestat, a gamma secretase inhibitor. In 2020, the FDA granted fast track designation to PBCAR269A for the treatment of relapsed or refractory multiple myeloma, having previously provided orphan drug designation.
