= MPAA (disambiguation) =

MPAA often refers to Motion Picture Association of America.

MPAA may also refer to:

- 4-Mercaptophenylacetic acid
- Meril-Prothom Alo Awards
