= LIC =

LIC is a three-letter abbreviation that may refer to:

- Hlai language (an ISO639-3 code: lic)
- Laudetur Iesus Christus, a Roman Catholic greeting
- Abbreviation for license
- Licentiate, a degree
- Life Insurance Corporation, an Indian government-owned corporation
- LIC or Love Insurance Corporation, working title for the Indian film Love Insurance Kompany
- Ligand-gated ion channel, a family of proteins
- Ligation-independent cloning, a form of molecular cloning
- Line integral convolution, a technique to visualize fluid motion
- Linear integrated circuit
- Listed investment company, the Australian term for "closed-end fund"
- Lithium-ion capacitor
- Livestock Improvement Corporation, a multinational dairy farming technology co-operative headquartered in New Zealand
- Local Interstellar Cloud, an interstellar cloud
- Long Island City, a neighborhood in Queens, New York City
- Low intensity conflict, in warfare
- Low-income country, a form of categorizing a country's level of development
- Lugar de Importancia Comunitaria, name for Site of Community Importance in Spain

== See also ==
- LICS (disambiguation)
