= D-stereospecific aminopeptidase =

Class of enzymes

D-aminopeptidase, domain B
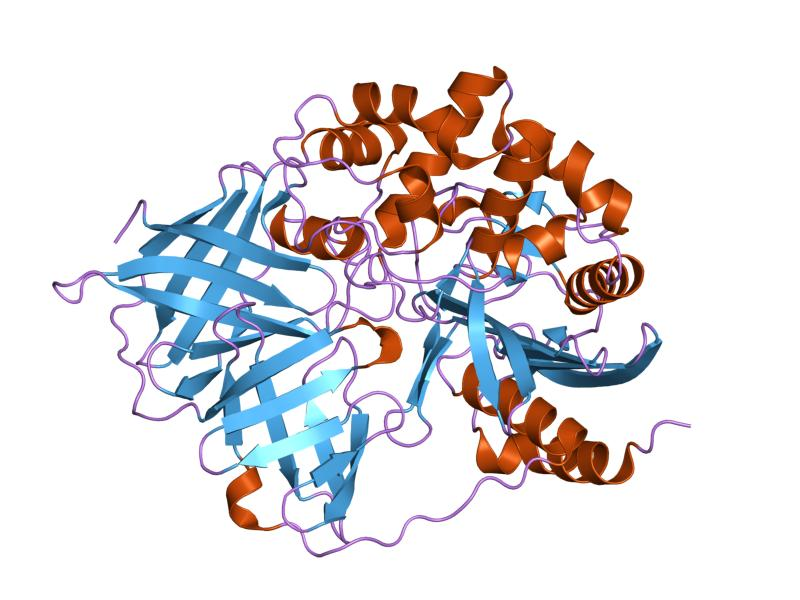
- crystal structure of a d-aminopeptidase from Brucella anthropi

Identifiers
- Symbol: DAP_B
- Pfam: PF07930
- Pfam clan: CL0013
- InterPro: IPR012856
- SCOP2: 1ei5 / SCOPe / SUPFAM
Available protein structures:
- PDB: IPR012856 PF07930 (ECOD; PDBsum)
- AlphaFold: IPR012856; PF07930

D-aminopeptidase, domain C
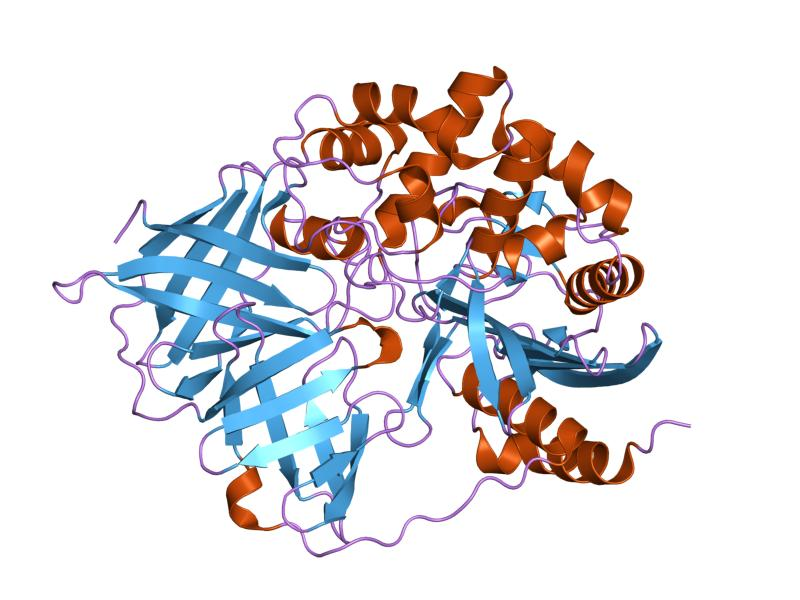
- crystal structure of a d-aminopeptidase from Brucella anthropi

Identifiers
- Symbol: DAP_C
- Pfam: PF07932
- InterPro: IPR012857
- SCOP2: 1ei5 / SCOPe / SUPFAM
Available protein structures:
- PDB: IPR012857 PF07932 (ECOD; PDBsum)
- AlphaFold: IPR012857; PF07932

In molecular biology, D-stereospecific aminopeptidase (D-aminopeptidase) EC 3.4.11.19 is an enzyme which catalyses the release of an N-terminal D-amino acid from a peptide, Xaa-|-Yaa-, in which Xaa is preferably D-Ala, D-Ser or D-Thr. D-amino acid amides and methyl esters also are hydrolyzed, as is glycine amide.

It is a dimeric enzyme with each monomer being composed of three domains. Domain B is organised to form a beta barrel made up of eight antiparallel beta strands. It is connected to domain A, the catalytic domain, by an eight-residue sequence, and also interacts with both domains A and C via non-covalent bonds. Domain B probably functions in maintaining domain C in a good position to interact with the catalytic domain. Domain C is organised to form a beta barrel made up of eight antiparallel beta strands. It is connected to domain B by a short linker sequence, and interacts extensively with the domain A, the catalytic domain. The gamma loop of domain C forms part of the wall of the catalytic pocket; domain C is in fact thought to confer substrate and inhibitor specificity to the enzyme.
