= N-acyl-D-amino-acid deacylase =

Class of enzymes

Identifiers
- EC no.: 3.5.1.81
- CAS no.: 65979-42-2

Databases
- IntEnz: IntEnz view
- BRENDA: BRENDA entry
- ExPASy: NiceZyme view
- KEGG: KEGG entry
- MetaCyc: metabolic pathway
- PRIAM: profile
- PDB structures: RCSB PDB PDBe PDBsum
- Gene Ontology: AmiGO / QuickGO
Search
- PMC: articles
- PubMed: articles
- NCBI: proteins

In enzymology, a N-acyl-D-amino-acid deacylase (EC 3.5.1.81) is an enzyme that catalyzes the chemical reaction

N-acyl-D-amino acid + H_{2}O $\rightleftharpoons$ an acid + D-amino acid

Thus, the two substrates of this enzyme are N-acyl-D-amino acid and H_{2}O, whereas its two products are acid and D-amino acid.

This enzyme belongs to the family of hydrolases, those acting on carbon-nitrogen bonds other than peptide bonds, specifically in linear amides. The systematic name of this enzyme class is N-acyl-D-amino acid amidohydrolase. It employs one cofactor, zinc.

== Structural studies ==
As of late 2007, 8 structures have been solved for this class of enzymes, with PDB accession codes 1M7J, 1RJP, 1RJQ, 1RJR, 1RK5, 1RK6, 1V4Y, and 1V51.
