= LICS =

LICS may refer to:

- Leeds Industrial Co-operative Society
- LICS (character set), Lotus International Character Set
- LICS (conference), Symposium on Logic in Computer Science
- Liberal and Centre Union (Liberalų ir centro sąjunga, LiCS), a Lithuanian political party
- Logic in computer science, field of logic and computer science

== See also ==
- LIC (disambiguation)
