= Luis Moroder =

Italian chemist (1940–2024)

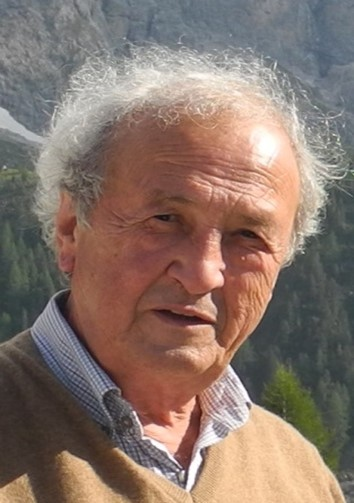
- Moroder in 2017
- Born: 6 December 1940; Urtijëi, Italy
- Died: 18 May 2024 (aged 83)
- Education: University of Padova, University of Pittsburgh, Technical University of Munich
- Scientific career
- Fields: Peptide chemistry, bioorganic chemistry, biophysical chemistry
- Workplaces: Max Planck Institute for Biochemistry

Luis Moroder (6 December 1940 – 18 May 2024) was an Italian peptide chemist, who pioneered research on the interactions between peptide hormones and cell membrane-bound hormone receptors. He later expanded this research to other biological systems of medical relevance such as protein inhibitors, collagens, and synthetic proteins. A hallmark of his research is interdisciplinarity as reflected in his use and development of methods in organic chemistry, biophysics and molecular biology. He was a co-editor of the five-volume Houben-Weyl, Methods of Organic Chemistry, Synthesis of Peptides and Peptidomimetics. From 2008 he was the editor-in-chief of the Journal of Peptide Science, the official journal of the European Peptide Society.

== Early life, education and career ==
Moroder studied chemistry at the University of Padova, where he graduated 1965 in chemistry with the doctoral thesis on synthesis of S-peptide of ribonuclease A in the laboratory of Ernesto Scoffone at the Institute of Organic Chemistry. In 1968 he joined Klaus H. Hofmann's Group at the University of Pittsburgh to work on chemical synthesis of the peptidic adrenocorticotropic hormone and its derivatives. Moroder habilitated in 1971 at the University of Padova in Chemistry of Natural Products. 1975 he became a senior research fellow in the Department of Peptide Chemistry at the Max Planck Institute for Biochemistry (MPIB) in Martinsried headed by Erich Wünsch. Between 1991 and 2008 he was the head of the Laboratory of Bioorganic chemistry at the MPIB. Since 1994 he was an adjunct professor at the Technical University of Munich.

== Research ==
Moroder started his peptide research with the synthesis of the S-peptide of ribonuclease A and studies on this protein-peptide complex. It was one of the first demonstrations of the key and lock principle in peptide hormone receptor interactions. As research associate he worked on the synthesis of radioactive adrenocorticotropin, which represents one of the first synthetic research works on human peptide hormones. Moroder's work at the Max Planck Institute for Biochemistry in Martinsried was initially focused on the gastrin and cholecystokinin system, revealing the mechanism for the membrane-bound pathway of hormone recognition by the receptors. In parallel, he worked on synthetic methods in peptide and protein chemistry such as the introduction of di-tert-butyl dicarbonate as a general and widely used reagent in peptide chemistry, regioselective assembly of cystine-rich peptides, and the synthesis of highly robust disulfide and diselenide scaffolds.

In the later phase of his research, Moroder became increasingly interested in the study of more complex biological and medical systems by chemical means. For example, he addressed fundamental questions of the kinetics of protein folding and actively contributed to the design and synthesis of enzyme inhibitors involved in various diseases, including cancer. In the 1990s Luis Moroder and Robert Huber supported Nediljko Budisa in establishing genetic code engineering in Germany - a research area that merges chemical syntheses with biological complexities in the form of chemical synthetic biology (Xenobiology).

== Personal life and death ==
Luis Moroder grew up in the small ethnic community of Ladins in the Dolomites of South Tyrol in Northern Italy. As a boy he became fascinated by natural science while accompanying his father Heinrich on mineralogical, paleontological and archaeological excursions in the mountain world of his homeland with discoveries of various fossiles that are exemplary shown in the Museum Gherdeina.

Moroder was married to Anne Marie Hellrigl-Moroder with one daughter. He died on 18 May 2024, at the age of 83.

== Awards and honours ==
- 1995: Max-Bergmann-Medal of the MBK Society
- 2004: Josef Rudinger Award of the European Peptide Society
- 2011: Doctor honoris causa, University of Cergy-Pontoise, Paris
- 2018: Akabori Memorial Lecture Award of the Japanese Peptide Society
- 2020: Ernesto Scoffone Award of the Italian Peptide Society
