= Intron-encoded endonuclease I-SceI =

Identifiers
- Organism: Saccharomyces cerevisiae S288C
- Symbol: SCEI
- Orthologs: OMA: entry
- PDB: 1R7M
- UniProt: P03882
Search for
- Structures: Swiss-model
- Domains: InterPro

Intron-encoded endonuclease I-Sce I is a homing endonuclease. The enzyme is used in biotechnology as a meganuclease. It recognises an 18-base pair sequence TAGGGATAACAGGGTAAT and leaves a 4 base pair 3' hydroxyl overhang. It is a rare cutting endonuclease. Statistically an 18-bp sequence will occur once in every 6.9*10^{10} base pairs (a frequency of 1 in 4^{18}). This sequence does not normally occur in a human, frog, or mouse genome.

== Sources ==
I-SceI is coded by introns. It is present in the mitochondria of yeast Saccharomyces cerevisiae.
