= Fluorescent D-amino acids =

Fluorescent D-amino acids (FDAAs) are D-amino acid derivatives whose side-chain terminal is covalently coupled with a fluorophore molecule. FDAAs incorporate into the bacterial peptidoglycan (PG) in live bacteria, resulting in strong peripheral and septal PG labeling without affecting cell growth. They are featured with their in-situ incorporation mechanisms which enable time-course tracking of new PG formation. To date, FDAAs have been employed for studying the cell wall synthesis in various bacterial species (both gram-positives and gram-negatives) through different techniques, such as microscopy, mass spectrometry, flow cytometry.

== Structures and general properties ==
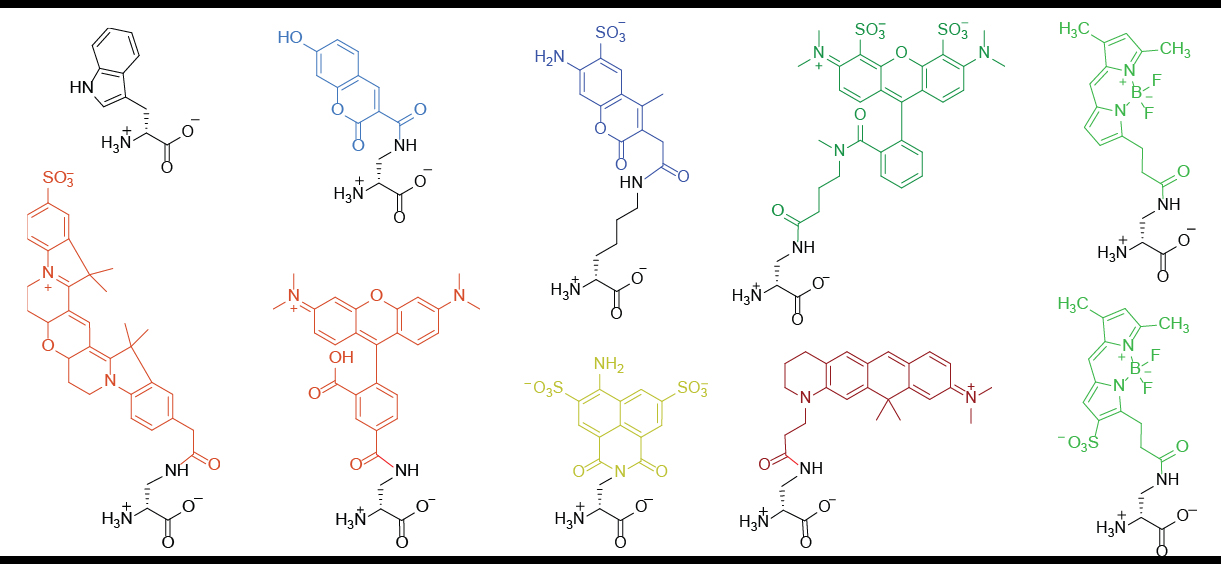
Collection of reported fluorescent D-amino acids and their structures.

FDAA consists of a D-amino acid and a fluorophore (coupled through the amino acid side chain). The D-amino acid backbone is required for its incorporation into the bacterial peptidoglycan through the activity of DD-transpeptidases. Once being incorporated, one can use fluorescence-detection techniques to visualize the location of new PG formation as well as the growth rate.

D-Alanine is the most well-studied D-amino acid for FDAA development because it is a naturally existing residue in bacterial peptidoglycan structures. On the other hand, various fluorophores have been employed for FDAA applications and each has its features. For example, coumarin-based FDAA (HADA) is small enough to penetrate the bacterial outer membranes and thus is widely used for gram-negative bacterial studies; while TAMRA-based FDAA (TADA) features its high brightness and photo/thermo-stability, which is suitable for super-resolution microscopy (strong excitation light is used).

== Proposed FDAA incorporation mechanisms ==
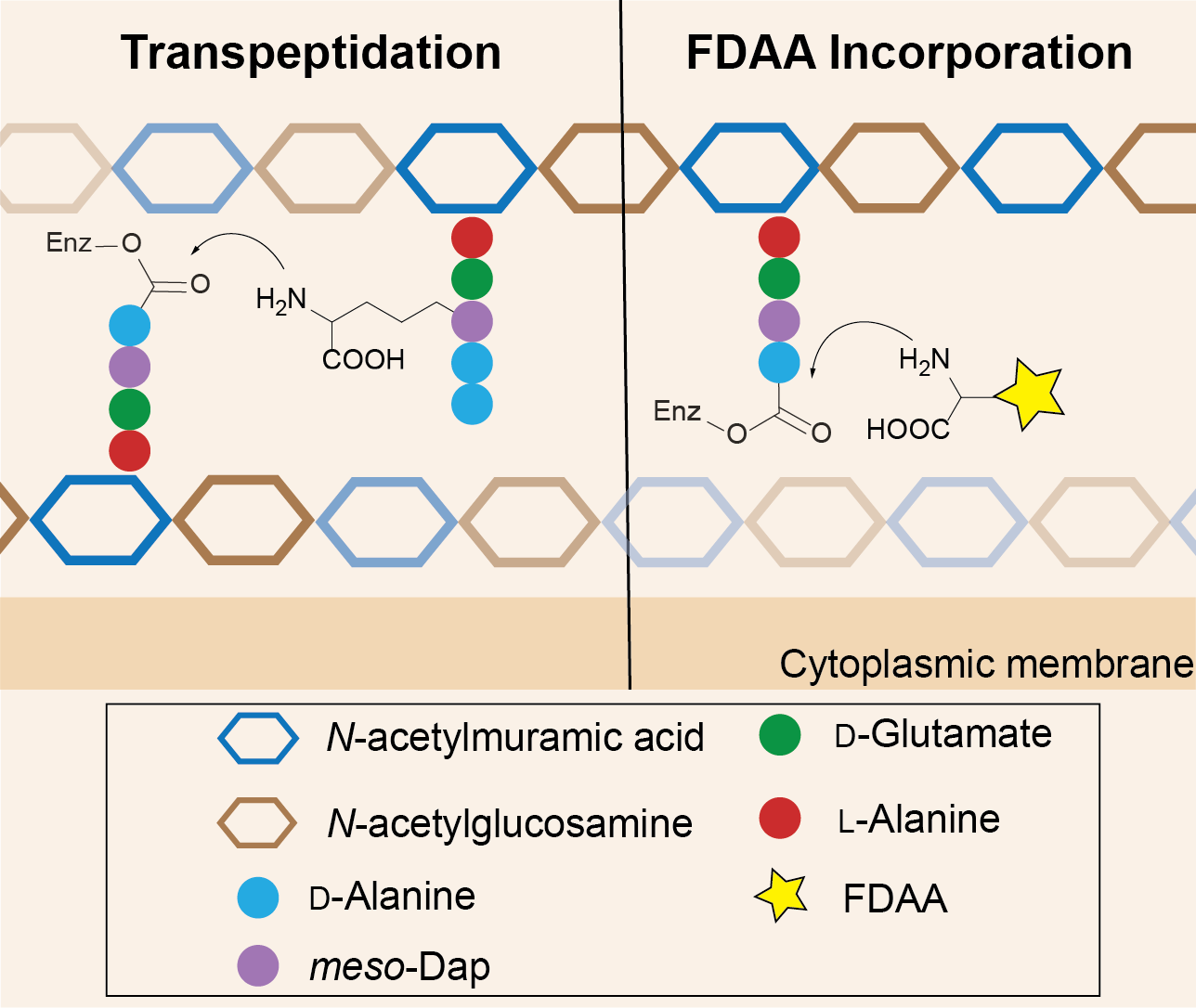
Proposed mechanism of FDAA incorporation into bacterial peptidoglycan.

Peptidoglycan (PG) is a mesh-like structure containing polysaccharides cross-linked by peptide chains. Penicillin-binding proteins (DD-transpeptidases), in short PBPs, recognize the PG peptides and catalyze the cross-linking reactions. These enzymes are reported to have high specificity toward the chirality center of the amino acid backbone (D-chiral center) but relatively low specificity toward the side-chain structure. Therefore, when FDAAs are present, they are taken by PBPs for the cross-linking reactions, resulting in their incorporation into the PG peptide chains. At proper concentration, e.g. 1–2 mM, FDAAs labeling does not affect PG synthesis and cell growth because only 1%–2% of PG peptide chains are labeled with FDAA.

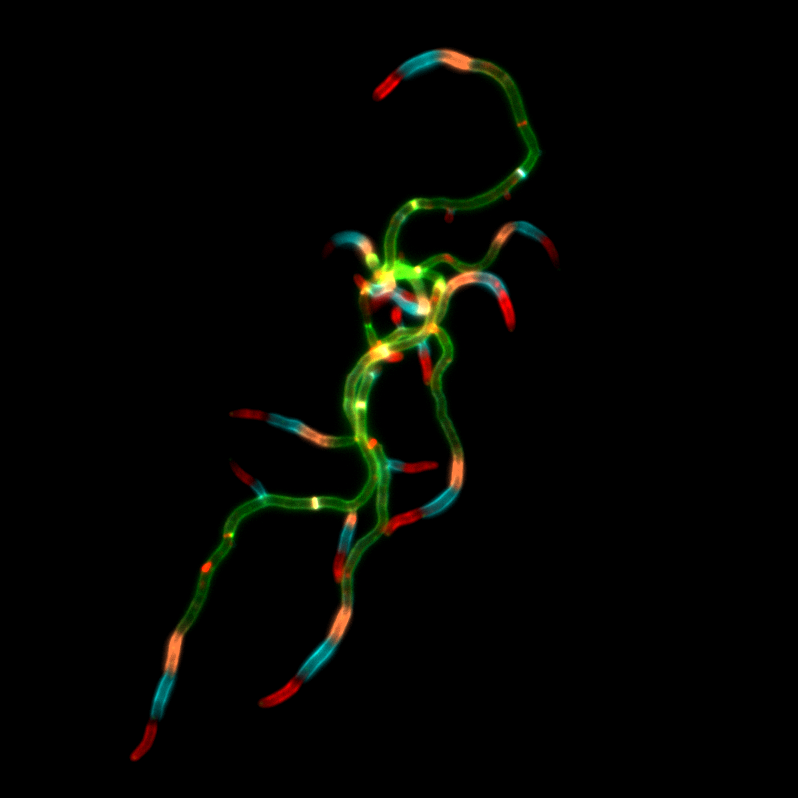
Sequential labeling of FDAAs revealed the growth pattern of peptidoglycan in Streptomyces venezuelae.

== Applications ==
Published studies utilizing FDAAs as tools include:

- Visualizing bacterial cell wall structures.
- Studying bacterial cell wall growth.
- Monitoring bacterial cell wall turnover.
- Quantifying bacterial cell wall growth activity.
- Assaying the anti-cell wall ability of antibiotics.
- Screening new anti-cell wall antibiotics.
- Tracking transpeptidase activity in vitro.
