= Native chemical ligation =

Chemical way to synthesize proteins

Native Chemical Ligation (NCL) is an important extension of the chemical ligation concept for constructing a larger polypeptide chain by the covalent condensation of two or more unprotected peptides segments. Native chemical ligation is the most effective method for synthesizing native or modified proteins of typical size (i.e., proteins< ~300 AA).

== Reaction ==
In native chemical ligation, the ionized thiol group of an N-terminal cysteine residue of an unprotected peptide attacks the C-terminal thioester of a second unprotected peptide, in an aqueous buffer at pH 7.0 and room temperature. This transthioesterification step is reversible in the presence of an aryl thiol catalyst, rendering the reaction both chemoselective and regioselective, and leads to formation of a thioester-linked intermediate. The intermediate rapidly and spontaneously rearranges by an intramolecular S,N-acyl shift that results in the formation of a native amide ('peptide') bond at the ligation site (scheme 1).

Scheme 1: The two-step mechanism of native chemical ligation.

Remarks :

- Thiol additives :

The initial transthioesterification step of the native chemical ligation reaction is catalyzed by thiol additives. The most effective and commonly used thiol catalyst is 4-mercaptophenylacetic acid (MPAA), (ref).

- Regioselectivity:

The key feature of native chemical ligation of unprotected peptides is the reversibility of the first step, the thiol(ate)–thioester exchange reaction. Native chemical ligation is exquisitely regioselective because that thiol(ate)–thioester exchange step is freely reversible in the presence of an added arylthiol catalyst. The high yields of final ligation product obtained, even in the presence of internal Cys residues in either/both segments, is the result of the irreversibility of the second (S-to-N acyl shift) amide-forming step under the reaction conditions used.

- Chemoselectivity of NCL :

No side-products are formed from reaction with the other functional groups present in either peptide segment (e.g. Asp, Glu side chain carboxylic acids; Lys epsilon amino group; Tyr phenolic hydroxyl; Ser, Thr hydroxyls, etc.).

== Historical context ==
In 1992, Stephen Kent and Martina Schnölzer at The Scripps Research Institute developed the "Chemical Ligation" concept, the first practical method to covalently condense unprotected peptide segments; the key feature of chemical ligation is formation of an unnatural bond at the ligation site. Just two years later in 1994, Philip Dawson, Tom Muir and Stephen Kent reported "Native Chemical Ligation", an extension of the chemical ligation concept to the formation of a native amide ('peptide') bond after initial nucleophilic condensation formed a thioester-linked condensation product designed to spontaneously rearrange to the native amide bond at the ligation site.

Theodor Wieland and coworkers had reported the S-to-N acyl shift as early as 1953, when the reaction of valine-thioester and cysteine amino acid in aqueous buffer was shown to yield the dipeptide valine-cysteine. The reaction proceeded through the intermediacy of a thioester containing the sulfur of the cysteine residue. However, Wieland's work did NOT lead to the development of the native chemical ligation reaction. Rather, the study of amino acid thioester reactions led Wieland and others to develop the 'active ester' method for the synthesis of protected peptide segments by conventional chemical methods carried out in organic solvents.

== Features ==
Native chemical ligation forms the basis of modern chemical protein synthesis, and has been used to prepare numerous proteins and enzymes by total chemical synthesis. The payoff in the native chemical ligation method is that coupling long peptides by this technique is typically near quantitative and provides synthetic access to large peptides and proteins otherwise impossible to make, due to their large size, decoration by post-translational modification, and containing non-coded amino acid or other chemical building blocks.

Native chemical ligation is inherently 'Green' in its atom economy and its use of benign solvents. It involves the reaction of an unprotected peptide thioester with a second, unprotected peptide that has an N-terminal cysteine residue. It is carried out in aqueous solution at neutral pH, usually in 6 M guanidine.hydrochloride, in the presence of an arylthiol catalyst and typically gives near-quantitative yields of the desired ligation product.

Peptide-thioesters can be directly prepared by Boc chemistry SPPS; however, thioester-containing peptides are not stable to treatment with a nucleophilic base, thus preventing direct synthesis of peptide thioesters by Fmoc chemistry SPPS. Fmoc chemistry solid phase peptide synthesis techniques for generating peptide-thioesters are based on the synthesis of peptide hydrazides that are converted to peptide thioesters post-synthetically.

Polypeptide C-terminal thioesters can also be produced in situ, using so-called N,S-acyl shift systems. Bis(2-sulfanylethyl)amido group, also called SEA group, belongs to this family. Polypeptide C-terminal bis(2-sulfanylethyl)amides (SEA peptide segments) react with Cys peptide to give a native peptide bond as in NCL. This reaction, which is called SEA Native Peptide Ligation, is a useful variant of native chemical ligation.

In making peptide segments that contain an N-terminal cysteine residue, exposure to ketones should be avoided since these may cap the N-terminal cysteine. Do not use protecting groups that release aldehydes or ketones. For the same reason, the use of acetone should be avoided, particularly in washing glassware used for lyophilization.

A feature of the native chemical ligation technique is that the product polypeptide chain contains cysteine at the site of ligation. The cysteine at the ligation site can be desulfurized to alanine, thus extending the range of possible ligation sites to include alanine residues. Other beta-thiol containing amino acids can be used for native chemical ligation, followed by desulfurization. Alternatively, thiol-containing ligation auxiliaries can be used that mimic an N-terminal cysteine for the ligation reaction, but which can be removed after synthesis. The use of thiol-containing auxiliaries may not be as effective as ligation at a Cys residue. Native chemical ligation can also be performed with an N-terminal selenocysteine residue.

Polypeptide C-terminal thioesters produced by recombinant DNA techniques can be reacted with an N-terminal Cys containing polypeptide by the same native ligation chemistry to provide very large semi-synthetic proteins. Native chemical ligation of this kind using a recombinant polypeptide segment is known as Expressed Protein Ligation. Similarly, a recombinant protein containing an N-terminal Cys can be reacted with a synthetic polypeptide thioester. Thus, native chemical ligation can be used to introduce chemically synthesized segments into recombinant proteins, regardless of size.

== See also ==
- Intein
- KAHA Ligation
- Peptide synthesis
- Protein synthesis
- SEA Native Peptide Ligation
