= Very short patch repair =

Vsr
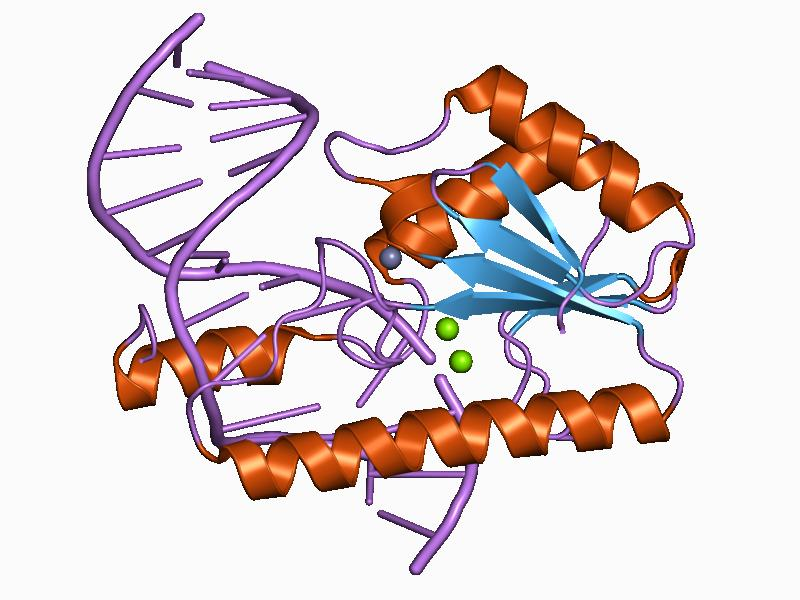
- Crystal structure of a very short patch repair (VSR) endonuclease in complex with duplex DNA

Identifiers
- Symbol: Vsr
- Pfam: PF03852
- Pfam clan: CL0236
- InterPro: IPR004603
- SCOP2: 1vsr / SCOPe / SUPFAM
Available protein structures:
- PDB: IPR004603 PF03852 (ECOD; PDBsum)
- AlphaFold: IPR004603; PF03852

Very short patch (VSP) repair is a DNA repair system that removes GT mismatches created by the deamination of 5-methylcytosine to thymine. This system exists because the glycosylases which normally target deaminated bases cannot target thymine (it being one of the regular four bases in DNA).

The components of the system are MutS, which binds to the GT mismatch, the VSR endonuclease, which cuts the DNA, and MutL, which recruits the UvrD helicase.

VSR (very short patch repair) endonucleases occur in a variety of bacteria. They work by cutting, or rather, making a nick in DNA if the base pair is mutated or damaged.

== Function ==
Mutations in the base pairs of DNA can be harmful to the organism. In particular, C to T mutations occur quite often due to methylation of cytosine. Hence, the VSR endonucleases have a function to protect the cell from damage caused by mutated DNA.

== Mechanism ==
VSR recognises a TG mismatched base pair, generated after spontaneous deamination of methylated cytosines, and it creates a nick on a single strand by cleaving the phosphate backbone on the 5' side of the thymine. Then DNA Polymerase I removes the T and some nucleotides on the 3' strand and then resynthesises the patch.

Additionally, GT mismatches can lead to C-to-T transition mutations if not repaired. VSR repairs the mismatches in favour of the G-containing strand. In Escherichia coli, this endonuclease nicks double-stranded DNA within the sequence CT(AT)GN or NT(AT)GG next to the thymidine residue, which is mismatched to 2'-deoxyguanosine. The incision is mismatch-dependent and strand specific.

== Structure ==
The structure of VSR is similar to the core structure of restriction endonucleases, which have a 3-layer alpha/beta/alpha topology.

VSR has three aromatic residues (Phe67, Trp68 and Trp86), which intercalate into the major groove, bending the DNA and separating the two strands. The N-terminal domain stabilizes the interaction between the protein and the cleaved product, thereby protecting the nick from DNA ligase until the arrival of DNA Polymerase I.
