= KAHA Ligation =

The α-Ketoacid-Hydroxylamine (KAHA) Amide-Forming Ligation is a chemical reaction that is used to join two unprotected fragments in peptide synthesis. It is an alternative to the Native Chemical Ligation (NCL). KAHA Ligation was developed by Jeffrey W. Bode group at ETH Zürich (previously University of Pennsylvania).

== Overview ==
An α-ketoacid at the C-terminus of one peptide fragment reacts with a hydroxylamine at the N-terminus of another to form a peptide bond (amide bond).

The reaction can happen in the presence of unprotected side chains. It also does not require any coupling reagents or catalysts. The only byproducts are water and CO_{2}.

Type I KAHA Ligation (unmodified hydroxy group)

Type II KAHA Ligation (O-substituted hydroxylamine)

The first reported protein synthesized by KAHA ligation was human GLP-1 (7-36). Since then, a variety of small proteins (up to 200 residues) have been synthesized, including ubiquitin and other similar modifier proteins, hormone proteins, nitrophorin 4, S100A4 and cyclic proteins.

C-terminal ketoacid monomers are pre-loaded on resin via a linker for Fmoc-SPPS (Fmoc-based solid phase peptide synthesis). Initial research utilised sulfur ylide linkers, but more recently the group developed acid- and photo-labile ketoacid monomers that can be loaded directly on Rink Amide resin.

The most commonly used N-terminal hydroxylamine is the 5-oxaproline, which results in a homoserine residue after ligation and O-N rearrangement.
