= 4-Mercaptophenylacetic acid =

Names
- Preferred IUPAC name (4-Sulfanylphenyl)acetic acid
- Other names 2-(4-Mercaptophenyl)acetic acid 4-Mercaptophenylacetic acid MPAA

Identifiers
CAS Number	39161-84-7
3D model (JSmol)	Interactive image
ChEMBL	ChEMBL257258
ChemSpider	2635348
ECHA InfoCard	100.156.056
PubChem CID	3390511
UNII	M977MK9GKO
CompTox Dashboard (EPA)	DTXSID80392056
- InChI: InChI=1S/C8H8O2S/c9-8(10)5-6-1-3-7(11)4-2-6/h1-4,11H,5H2,(H,9,10) Key: ORXSLDYRYTVAPC-UHFFFAOYSA-N
- SMILES: C1=CC(=CC=C1CC(=O)O)S

Properties
Chemical formula	HSC_{6}H_{4}CH_{2}CO_{2}H
Molar mass	168.21 g/mol

Hazards
- GHS labelling
Pictograms	(GHS05: Corrosive) (GHS07: Exclamation mark)
Signal word	Danger
Hazard statements	H315, H318, H319, H335
Precautionary statements	P261, P264, P271, P280, P302+P352, P304+P340, P305+P351+P338, P310, P312, P321, P332+P313, P337+P313, P362, P403+P233, P405, P501
- Except where otherwise noted, data are given for materials in their standard state (at 25 °C [77 °F], 100 kPa). (what is ?) Infobox references

MPAA (4-Mercaptophenylacetic acid) is a redox buffer that increases the folding rate of disulfide-containing proteins.

MPAA is also used in native chemical ligation as a thiol catalyst.
