= Homing endonuclease =

Type of enzyme

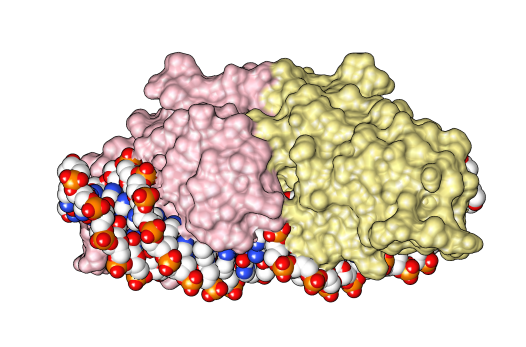
Crystal structure of I-CreI bound to its DNA recognition sequence. The enzyme binds as a homodimer; one subunit is depicted in yellow, the other in pink. The enzyme is shown in surface representation; DNA molecule is shown as a collection of spheres, each colored according to its chemical element.

The homing endonucleases are a collection of endonucleases encoded either as freestanding genes within introns, as fusions with host proteins, or as self-splicing inteins. They catalyze the hydrolysis of genomic DNA within the cells that synthesize them, but do so at very few, or even singular, locations. Repair of the hydrolyzed DNA by the host cell frequently results in the gene encoding the homing endonuclease having been copied into the cleavage site, hence the term 'homing' to describe the movement of these genes. Homing endonucleases can thereby transmit their genes horizontally within a host population, increasing their allele frequency at greater than Mendelian rates.

== Origin and mechanism ==
Although the origin and function of homing endonucleases is still being researched, the most established hypothesis considers them as selfish genetic elements, similar to transposons, because they facilitate the perpetuation of the genetic elements that encode them independent of providing a functional attribute to the host organism.

Homing endonuclease recognition sequences are long enough to occur randomly only with a very low probability (approximately once every 7×10^{9} bp), and are normally found in one or very few instances per genome. Generally, owing to the homing mechanism, the gene encoding the endonuclease (the HEG, "homing endonuclease gene") is located within the recognition sequence which the enzyme cuts, thus interrupting the homing endonuclease recognition sequence and limiting DNA cutting only to sites that do not (yet) carry the HEG.

Prior to transmission, one allele carries the gene (HEG^{+}) while the other does not (HEG^{−}), and is therefore susceptible to being cut by the enzyme. Once the enzyme is synthesized, it breaks the chromosome in the HEG^{−} allele, initiating a response from the cellular DNA repair system. The damage is repaired using recombination, taking the pattern of the opposite, undamaged DNA allele, HEG^{+}, that contains the gene for the endonuclease. Thus, the gene is copied to the allele that initially did not have it and it is propagated through successive generations. This process is called "homing".

== Nomenclature ==
Homing endonucleases are always indicated with a prefix that identifies their genomic origin, followed by a hyphen: "I-" for homing endonucleases encoded within an intron, "PI-" (for "protein insert") for those encoded within an intein. Some authors have proposed using the prefix "F-" ("freestanding") for viral enzymes and other natural enzymes not encoded by introns nor inteins, and "H-" ("hybrid") for enzymes synthesized in a laboratory. Next, a three-letter name is derived from the binominal name of the organism, taking one uppercase letter from the genus name and two lowercase letters from the specific name. (Some mixing is usually done for hybrid enzymes.) Finally, a Roman numeral distinguishes different enzymes found in the same organism:

- PI-TliII (P30317) is the second-identified enzyme encoded by an intein found in the archaea Thermococcus litoralis.
- H-DreI (PDB: 1MOW) is the first synthetic homing endonuclease, created in a laboratory from the enzymes I-DmoI (P21505) and I-CreI (P05725), taken respectively from Desulfurococcus mobilis and Chlamydomonas reinhardtii.

== Comparison to restriction enzymes ==
Homing endonucleases differ from Type II restriction enzymes in the several respects:

- Whereas Type II restriction enzymes bind short, usually symmetric, recognition sequences of 4 to 8 bp, homing endonucleases bind very long and in many cases asymmetric recognition sequences spanning 12 to 40 bp.
- Homing endonucleases are generally more tolerant of substitutions in the recognition sequence. Minor variations in the recognition sequence usually decrease the activity of homing endonucleases, but often do not completely abolish it as often occurs with restriction enzymes.
- Homing endonucleases share structural motifs that suggest there are four families, whereas it has not been possible to determine simply recognisable and distinguishable families of Type II restriction enzymes.
- Homing endonucleases act as monomers or homodimers, and often require associated proteins to regulate their activity or form ribonucleoprotein complexes, wherein RNA is an integral component of the catalytic apparatus. Type II restriction enzymes can also function alone, as monomers or homodimers, or with additional protein subunits, but the accessory subunits differ from those of the homing endonucleases. Thus, they can require restriction, modification, and specificity subunits for their action.
- Finally, homing endonucleases have a broader phylogenetic distribution, occurring in all three biological domains—the archaea, bacteria and eukarya. Type II restriction enzymes occur only in archaea, bacteria and certain viruses. Homing endonucleases are also expressed in all three compartments of the eukaryotic cell: nuclei, mitochondria and chloroplasts. Open reading frames encoding homing endonucleases have been found in introns, inteins, and in freestanding form between genes, whereas genes encoding Type II restriction enzyme genes have been found only in freestanding form, almost always in close association with genes encoding cognate DNA modifying enzymes. Thus, while the Type II restriction enzymes and homing endonucleases share the function of cleaving double-stranded DNA, they appear to have evolved independently.

== Structural families ==
A

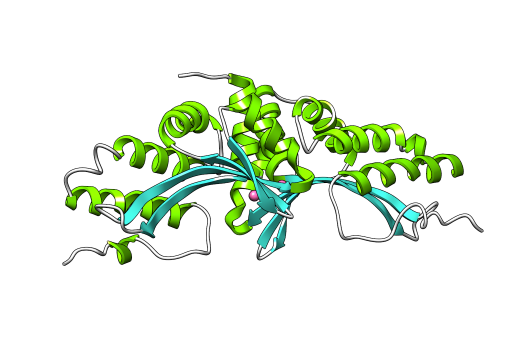

B

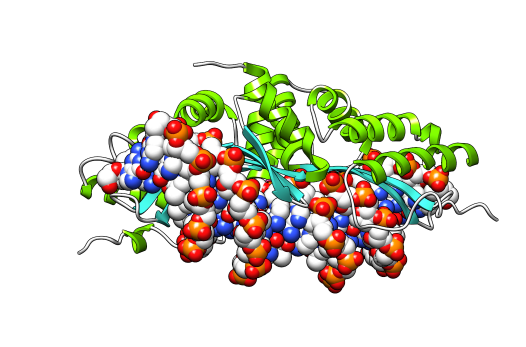

C

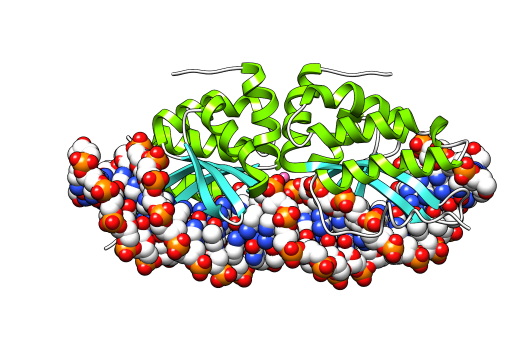

Dimer of the I-CreI homing endonuclease. Alpha helices are shown in green and beta sheets in blue. A: The two small pink spheres in the center of the structure are two metal cations necessary for catalysis. The structure shows the saddle that beta strands create to accommodate the DNA. These strands contain the LAGLIDADG motifs that interact with the DNA minor groove. B & C: DNA atoms are shown as spheres, colored according to chemical element.

LAGLIDADG endonuclease

Identifiers
- Symbol: LAGLIDADG_1
- Pfam: PF00961
- Pfam clan: CL0324
- InterPro: IPR001982
- CATH: 1af5
- SCOP2: 1af5 / SCOPe / SUPFAM
Available protein structures:
- PDB: IPR001982 PF00961 (ECOD; PDBsum)
- AlphaFold: IPR001982; PF00961
- See clan entry for related Pfam families.

GIY-YIG endonuclease, catalytic

Identifiers
- Symbol: GIY-YIG
- Pfam: PF01541
- InterPro: IPR000305
- PROSITE: PS50164
- CATH: 1mk0
- SCOP2: 1mk0 / SCOPe / SUPFAM
Available protein structures:
- PDB: IPR000305 PF01541 (ECOD; PDBsum)
- AlphaFold: IPR000305; PF01541

Currently there are six known structural families. Their conserved structural motifs are:

- LAGLIDADG: Every polypeptide has 1 or 2 LAGLIDADG motifs. The sequence LAGLIDADG is a conserved sequence of amino acids where each letter is a code that identifies a specific residue. This sequence is directly involved in the DNA cutting process. Those enzymes that have only one motif work as homodimers, creating a saddle that interacts with the major groove of each DNA half-site. The LAGLIDADG motifs contribute amino acid residues to both the protein-protein interface between protein domains or subunits, and to the enzyme's active sites. Enzymes that possess two motifs in a single protein chain act as monomers, creating the saddle in a similar way. The first structures to be determined of homing endonucleases (of PI-SceI and I-CreI, both reported in 1997) were both from the LAGLIDADG structural family., The following year, the first structure of a homing endonuclease (I-CreI) bound to its DNA target site was also reported.
- GIY-YIG: These have only one GIY-YIG motif, in the N-terminal region, that interacts with the DNA in the cutting site. The prototypic enzyme of this family is I-TevI which acts as a monomer. Separate structural studies have been reported of the DNA-binding and catalytic domains of I-TevI, the former bound to its DNA target and the latter in the absence of DNA.
- His-Cys box (Pfam PF05551): These enzymes possess a region of 30 amino acids that includes 5 conserved residues: two histidines and three cysteins. They co-ordinate the metal cation needed for catalysis. I-PpoI is the best characterized enzyme of this family and acts as a homodimer. Its structure was reported in 1998. It is possibly related to the H-N-H family, as they share common features.
- H-N-H: (Pfam CL0263): These have a consensus sequence of approximately 30 amino acids. It includes two pairs of conserved histidines and one asparagine that create a zinc finger domain. I-HmuI (P34081) is the best characterized enzyme of this family, and acts as a monomer. Its structure was reported in 2004 (PDB: 1U3E).
- PD-(D/E)xK (Pfam CL0236): These enzymes contain a canonical nuclease catalytic domain typically found in type II restriction endonucleases. The best characterized enzyme in this family, I-Ssp6803I (Q57253), acts as a tetramer. Its structure was reported in 2007 (PDB: 2OST). The overall fold is conserved in many endonuclease families, all of which belong to the PD-(D/E)xK superfamily.
- Vsr-like/EDxHD (DUF559, InterPro: IPR007569): These enzymes were discovered in the Global Ocean Sampling Metagenomic Database and first described in 2009. The term 'Vsr-like' refers to the presence of a C-terminal nuclease domain that displays recognizable homology to bacterial Very short patch repair (Vsr) endonucleases. The structure has been solved in 2011, confirming the Vsr homology. Is considered part of the PD-(D/E)xk superfamily.

== Domain architecture ==
Hom_end-associated Hint
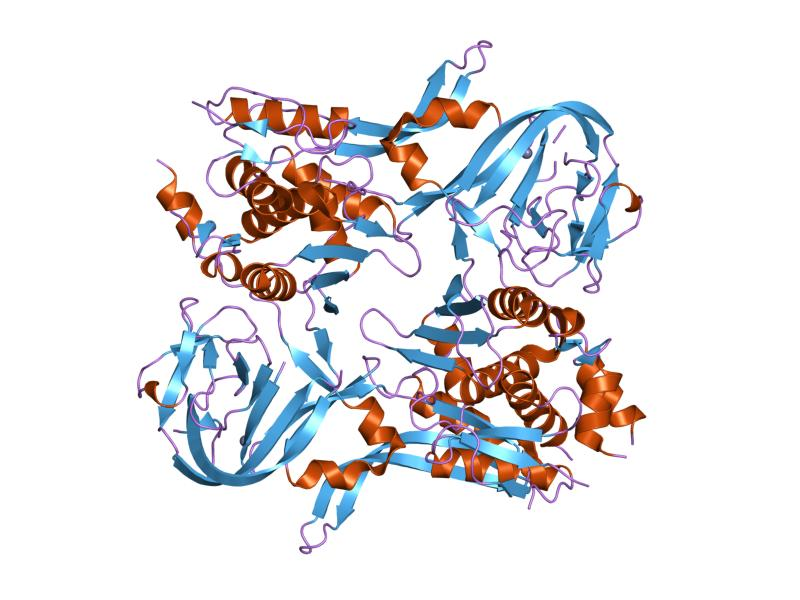
- crystal structure of pi-scei miniprecursor

Identifiers
- Symbol: Hom_end_hint
- Pfam: PF05203
- Pfam clan: CL0363
- InterPro: IPR007868
- SCOP2: 1gpp / SCOPe / SUPFAM
Available protein structures:
- PDB: IPR007868 PF05203 (ECOD; PDBsum)
- AlphaFold: IPR007868; PF05203
- Intein motif of the larger LAGLIDADG Hom_end domain.

The yeast homing endonuclease PI-Sce is a LAGLIDADG-type endonuclease encoded as an intein that splices itself out of another protein (P17255). The high-resolution structure reveals two domains: an endonucleolytic centre resembling the C-terminal domain of Hedgehog proteins, and a Hint domain (Hedgehog/Intein) containing the protein-splicing active site.

== See also ==
- REBASE, a comprehensive restriction enzyme database from New England Biolabs with links to related literature.
- List of homing endonuclease cutting sites
- I-CreI homing endonuclease
- Meganucleases
- Restriction enzyme
- Introns and inteins
- Intragenomic conflict: Homing endonuclease genes
- Transposon
