= Journal of Peptide Science =

- Discipline: Peptide chemistry
- Language: English
- Edited by: Paolo Rovero

Publication details
- History: 1995-present
- Publisher: John Wiley & Sons on behalf of the European Peptide Society
- Frequency: Monthly
- Impact factor: 2.6 (2025)

Standard abbreviations
- ISO 4: J. Pept. Sci.

Indexing
- CODEN: JPSIEL
- ISSN: 1075-2617 (print); 1099-1387 (web)
- LCCN: sv95002875
- OCLC no.: 44075420

Links
- Journal homepage; Online access; Online archive

The Journal of Peptide Science is a monthly peer-reviewed scientific journal, published since 1995 by John Wiley & Sons on behalf of the European Peptide Society. The current editor-in-chief is Paolo Rovero (Universita di Firenze).

== Abstracting and indexing ==
The journal is abstracted and indexed by Chemical Abstracts Service, MEDLINE/PubMed, Scopus, and the Science Citation Index Expanded. According to the Journal Citation Reports, the journal has a 2025 impact factor of 2.6.

== Most-cited papers ==
The three most-cited papers published in this journal are:

1. "The cyclization of peptides and depsipeptides", Volume 9, Issue 8, Aug 2003, Pages: 471–501, Davies JS
2. "Antibacterial peptides isolated from insects", Volume 6, Issue 10, Oct 2000, Pages: 497–511, Otvos L
3. "Amyloid beta-peptide interactions with neuronal and glial cell plasma membrane: Binding sites and implications for Alzheimer's disease", Volume 10, Issue 5, May 2004, Pages: 229–248, Verdier Y, Zarandi M, Penke B
