= Ligation-independent cloning =

Ligation-independent cloning (LIC) is a form of molecular cloning that can be performed without the use of restriction endonucleases or DNA ligase. The technique was developed in the early 1990s as an alternative to restriction enzyme/ligase cloning. This allows genes to be cloned without the requirement of a restriction site for cloning that is absent from the gene insert. LIC uses long complementary overhangs on the vector and the DNA insert to create a stable association between them.

== Steps in Procedure ==
1. Design PCR Primers with LIC extension
2. Perform PCR to amplify gene
3. Purify PCR product
4. Create 5' overhangs
5. Incubate vector and PCR product to anneal
6. Transform
