= D-Amino acid =

Class of chemical compounds

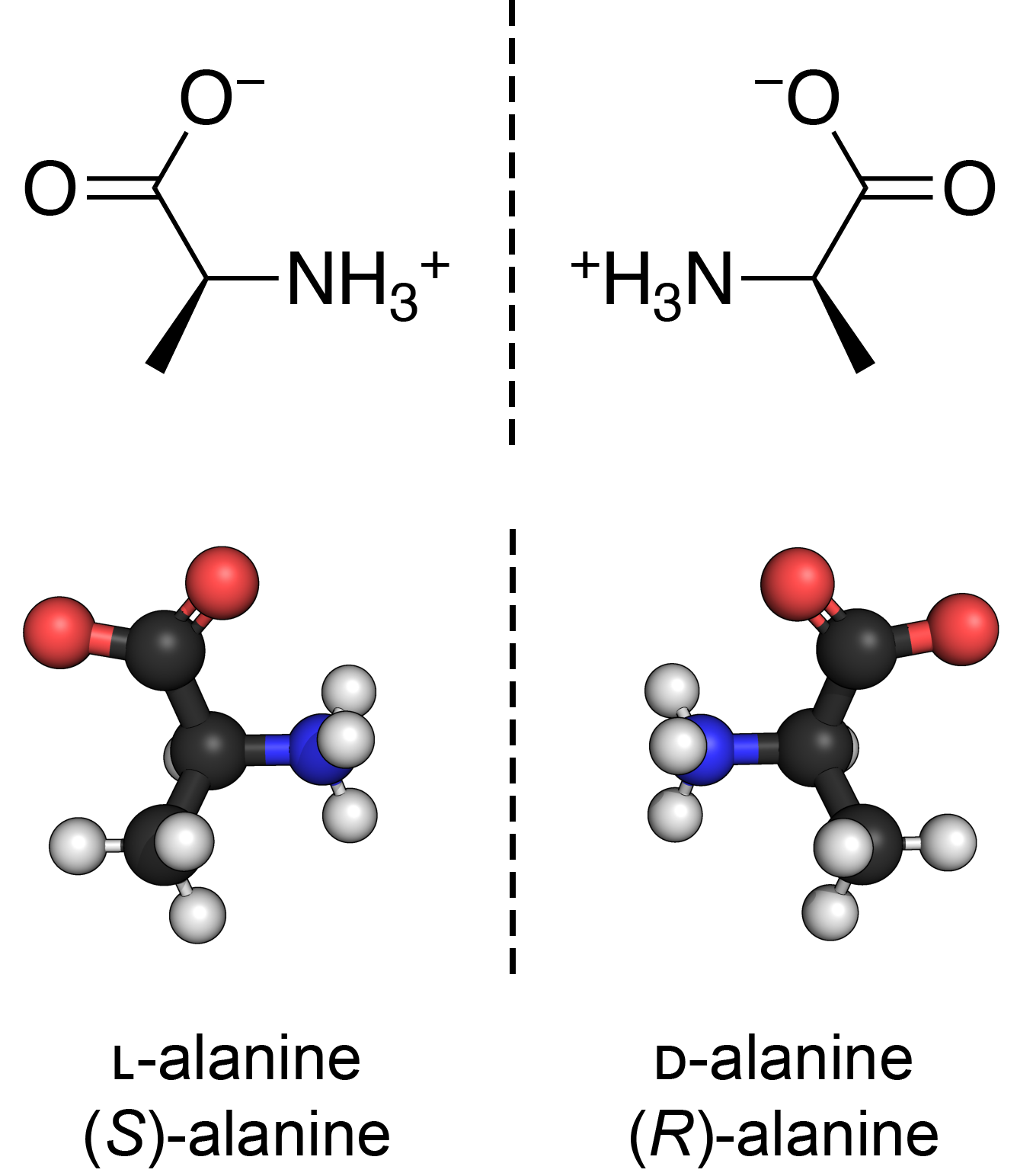
L-amino acids are the mirror reflection of D-amino acids, and vice versa. In this example, alanine is depicted in the zwitterionic form at physiological pH.

D-Amino acids are amino acids where the stereogenic carbon alpha to the amino group has the D-configuration. For most naturally occurring amino acids, this carbon has the L-configuration. D-Amino acids are occasionally found in nature as residues in proteins. They are formed from ribosomally derived D-amino acid residues.

Amino acids, as components of peptides, peptide hormones, structural and immune proteins, are the most important bioregulators involved in all life processes along with nucleic acids, carbohydrates and lipids. "Environmental ᴅ-amino acids are thought to be derived from organic diagenesis such as racemization and release from bacterial cell walls and even from microbial production."

== Discovery ==
Their discovery was in the 1950s. "Auclair and Patton (1950) first reported their presence in the blood of insects and mollusks". They also have been identified in various mammalian tissues. The two major types of D-amino acids synthesized in and by mammals are D-aspartic acid (D-Asp) and D-serine (D-Ser). "D-Asp is present in vertebrates and invertebrates and is involved in the development of both the nervous and endocrine systems". An immense amount of D-Ser can also be detected in the brain, wherein it composes a significant regulatory role in the development of the "central nervous system and is closely associated with learning, memory, and mammalian behavior." A great amount of D-Ser, has also been "detected in human urine; it plays a regulatory role in pathogenic gene expression in the urinary system." Furthermore, they have also been noticed in certain tissues of some marine invertebrates, and "might be involved in regulating osmotic pressure." It is still unclear however, on as to whether they are absorbed from seawater, or are made by the organisms themselves. They have also been identified in plants. A number of D-amino acids also constrain the growth of plants, "while some plants can absorb and metabolize or assimilate ᴅ-amino acids".

== Structure and general properties ==
L- and D-amino acids are usually enantiomers. The exceptions are two amino acids with two stereogenic centers, threonine and isoleucine. Aside from those two special cases, L- and D-amino acids have identical properties (color, solubility, melting point) under many conditions. In the biological context however, which is chiral, these enantiomers can behave very differently. Thus, D-amino acids have low nutritional value, in part because they are not digested well.

They contain a carboxyl group at one end and a side chain group at the other end. They also contain an amine and hydrogen group on opposite ends, depending on which enantiomer one is looking at. They also do attain a chiral carbon center. This is why the molecules can exist in different stereoisomeric forms, and the orientation of the radical groups is what is only different between these enantiomers. D-glyceraldehyde on the other hand, contains a carbonyl group and hydroxy (alcohol) groups with the chiral carbon in the center. The orientation is again, different for L-glyceraldehyde.

== Occurrence and use ==
Even though D-amino acids are minimal constituents of living organisms, they occur in a broad range of natural environments such as soils, rivers, lakes, marine systems, snow and ice, aerosols and precipitation. They are produced by several marine microbes, which attain important roles in the carbon and energy cycles in the ocean, and contribute as a carbon source to the oceanic carbon reservoir.

D-Amino acid residues occur in cone snails and the venom of the male platypus. They are also abundant components of the peptidoglycan cell walls of bacteria, and D-serine may act as a neurotransmitter in the brain. D-Amino acids are used in racemic crystallography to create centrosymmetric crystals, which, depending on the protein, may allow for easier and more robust protein structure determination.

Gramicidin is a polypeptide made up from mixture of D- and L-amino acids. Other compounds containing D-amino acids are tyrocidine and valinomycin. These compounds disrupt bacterial cell walls, particularly in gram-positive bacteria. As of 2011, only 837 D-amino acids were found in the Swiss-Prot database out of a total of 187 million amino acids analysed.

Fluorescently labeled D-amino acids, namely FDAAs, have been used for in situ labeling of bacterial peptidoglycan in both gram-positive and gram-negative species.

== Bacteria and D-Amino acids ==
Bacteria probably have the largest capacity to utilize D-amino acids. They have been known to synthesize more than 10 kinds of D-amino acids, most frequently D-alanine and D-glutamate for crosslinking within the peptidoglycan cell wall. In addition, extracellular D-amino acids released from bacteria also control remodeling of the bacterial cell wall and are moreover, thought to function amongst bacteria to accommodate frequently changing environments. Apart from structural function in the bacterial cell wall, D-amino acids have also been associated to growth fitness and to further processes such as biofilm development, spore germination and signaling.

== Biosynthesis ==
At least two enzyme families convert L-amino acids to D-amino acids. Amino-acid racemase, a PLP-dependent enzyme, racemizes amino acids via the formation of the α-iminoacids, where the stereogenic center is lost. L-amino-acid oxidases convert L-amino acids to the α-ketoacids, which are susceptible to reductive amination. Some amino acids are prone to racemization, one example being lysine, which racemizes via formation of pipecolic acid.

In peptides, L-amino acid residues slowly racemize, resulting in the formation of some D-amino acid residues. Racemization occurs via deprotonation of the methyne that is alpha to the amido group. Rates increase with pH.

Many D-amino acids found in higher organisms are derived from microbial sources. The D-alanine in peptidoglycans that comprise bacterial cell walls helps its host resist attack by proteolytic enzymes. Several antibiotics, e.g. bacitracin, contain D-amino acid residues.

== Previous studies ==
Phaeobacter sp. JL2886, a deep sea strain that was sequestered in 2012 from a sediment that was 2000 m deep in the South China sea, "was analyzed for its entire genome sequence". In another study, from 56 sediments collected from the deep sea (depth range 800–1500 m), "28 ᴅ-amino acid utilizers" were isolated, in Sagami Bay, Japan. Independent attempts to sequester micro-organisms that grow healthier, due to D-amino acids, has also been done. Most conducted studies and experiments usually also utilize mainly D-alanine, D-aspartate, and D-glutamate, as they signify the most common D-amino acids found in living organisms. Moreover, they also aid as nitrogen sources for many of the fundamental processes involved in the ocean.
