= Chemical ligation =

Chemical ligation is the chemoselective condensation of unprotected peptide segments enabled by the formation of a non-native bond at the ligation site.

Chemical ligation is usually carried out in aqueous solution. Multiple consecutive chemical ligation reactions can be used to make proteins of the typical size found in nature, i.e. with polypeptide chains containing 200–300 amino acids, produced by total synthesis.

== Principle of chemical ligation ==
The "chemical ligation" concept was introduced by Kent in the early 1990s. It consisted of a novel approach to the covalent condensation of unprotected peptide segments by means of "unique, mutually reactive functionalities, one on each reacting peptide segment, designed to react only with each other and not with any of the functional groups found in (native) peptides". Chemical ligation of unprotected peptides is enabled by formation of an unnatural moiety, i.e. non-peptide bond, linking the two peptide segments in the ligation product. It was envisioned as a general method that would greatly simplify the chemical synthesis of protein molecules and enable the application of the entire repertoire of chemistry to the world of the proteins.

=== Native chemical ligation ===
The most practical and robust method for the chemoselective reaction of unprotected peptides is native chemical ligation. The original chemical ligation methods involved the formation of a non-native bond at the ligation site. Subsequently, native chemical ligation was developed. In native chemical ligation, an unprotected peptide thioester reacts with the N-terminal cysteine of a second peptide to give a ligation product in which a native peptide bond joins the two peptide segments In this method, an initial thioester-linked ligation product intermediate rearranges to form an amide bond. Native chemical ligation overcomes the limitations of the classical synthetic organic chemistry approach to the total synthesis of proteins, and enabled the routine total or semi- synthesis of protein molecules.

Native chemical ligation relies on the presence of a cysteine residue at the ligation site. Methods using removable auxiliary groups can in some instances extend the use of native chemical ligation to non-cysteine residues, as can the use of desulfurization subsequent to the ligation (e.g. converting a Cys to an Ala).

=== Expressed protein ligation ===
By exploiting naturally occurring inteins it is possible to prepare a recombinant polypeptide C-terminal thioester. This enables the use of large recombinant protein-derived thioesters in native chemical ligation. The recombinant thioester can be ligated to a synthetic peptide bearing an N-terminal cysteine. Native chemical ligation of this kind using recombinant C-terminal thioesters is known as expressed protein ligation. Recombinant expression can also be used to give a Cys-polypeptide for use in native chemical ligation.

=== Staudinger ligation ===
The Staudinger ligation, first reported in 2000, in principle enables the ligation of peptide segments independent of the terminal amino acids. The method is based on the Staudinger reaction. The Staudinger ligation continues to be developed but has not yet found widespread use.

=== Ser/Thr ligation ===
Ser/Thr ligation was introduced into protein chemical synthesis as an alternative native chemical ligation method. Serine/Threonine-ligation involves condensation of a side-chain unprotected peptide segment containing a C-terminal salicylaldehyde ester and another peptide segment with an N-terminal Ser or Thr residue. The chemoselective reaction between the peptide salicylaldehyde ester and 1,2-hydroxylamine group of Ser or Thr leads to the formation of an N,O-benzylidene acetal-linked intermediate, which undergoes acidolysis to afford a natural peptidic Xaa-Ser/Thr linkage. Ser/Thr ligation provides a complementary method for protein chemical synthesis and semisynthesis.
