= List of restriction enzyme cutting sites: C–D =

Legend of nucleobases
Code	Nucleotide represented
A	Adenine (A)
C	Cytosine (C)
G	Guanine (G)
T	Thymine (T)
N	A, C, G or T
M	A or C
R	A or G
W	A or T
Y	C or T
S	C or G
K	G or T
H	A, C or T
B	C, G or T
V	A, C or G
D	A, G or T

This article contains a list of the most studied restriction enzymes whose names start with C to D inclusive. It contains approximately 80 enzymes.

The following information is given:

- Enzyme: Accepted name of the molecule, according to the internationally adopted nomenclature, and bibliographical references. (Further reading: see the section "Nomenclature" in the article "Restriction enzyme".)
- PDB code: Code used to identify the structure of a protein in the PDB database of protein structures. The 3D atomic structure of a protein provides highly valuable information to understand the intimate details of its mechanism of action.
- Source: Organism that naturally produces the enzyme.
- Recognition sequence: Sequence of DNA recognized by the enzyme and to which it specifically binds.
- Cut: Cutting site and DNA products of the cut. The recognition sequence and the cutting site usually match, but sometimes the cutting site can be dozens of nucleotides away from the recognition site.
- Isoschizomers and neoschizomers: An isoschizomer is an enzyme that recognizes the same sequence as another. A neoschizomer is a special type of isoschizomer that recognizes the same sequence as another, but cuts in a different manner. A maximum number of 8-10 most common isoschizomers are indicated for every enzyme but there may be many more. Neoschizomers are shown in bold and green color font (e.g.: **BamHI**). When "None on date" is indicated, that means that there were no registered isoschizomers in the databases on that date with a clearly defined cutting site. Isoschizomers indicated in white font and grey background correspond to enzymes not listed in the current lists:

as in this not listed enzyme:	EcoR70I

== Restriction enzymes ==
=== C ===
**Enzyme**	**PDB code**	Source	**Recognition sequence**	**Cut**	**Isoschizomers**
CacI		Clostridium acetobutylicum N1-4081	5' GATC; 3' CTAG	5' --- GATC--- 3'; 3' ---CTAG --- 5'
Cac8I		Clostridium acetobutylicum ABKn8	5' GCNNGC; 3' CGNNCG	5' ---GCN NGC--- 3'; 3' ---CGN NCG--- 5'
CaiI		Comamonas acidovarans Iti19-021	5' CAGNNNCTG; 3' GTCNNNGAC	5' ---CAGNNN CTG--- 3'; 3' ---GTC NNNGAC--- 5'	AlwNI
CauI		Chloroflexus aurantiacus	5' GGWCC; 3' CCWGG	5' ---G GWCC--- 3'; 3' ---CCWG G--- 5'	BamNxI, BcuAI, BsrAI, Eco47I, FspMSI, HgiCII, HgiJI, SmuEI
CauII		Chloroflexus aurantiacus	5' CCSGG; 3' GGSCC	5' ---CC SGG--- 3'; 3' ---GGS CC--- 5'	AhaI, AseII, AsuC2I, BcnI, **Eco1831I**, **EcoHI**, **Kpn49kII**, NciI
CauB3I		Chloroflexus aurantiacus B3	5' TCCGGA; 3' AGGCCT	5' ---T CCGGA--- 3'; 3' ---AGGCC T--- 5'	Aor13HI, BbvAIII, BseAI, BspEI, BspMII, Kpn2I, MroI, PtaI
CbiI		Clostridium bifermentans B-4	5' TTCGAA; 3' AAGCTT	5' ---TT CGAA--- 3'; 3' ---AAGC TT--- 5'	Asp10HI, Bim19I, BsiCI, BspT104I, Csp45I, LspI, NspV, SspRFI
CboI		Clostridium botulinum	5' CCGG; 3' GGCC	5' ---C CGG--- 3'; 3' ---GGC C--- 5'
CbrI		Citrobacter braakii 1146	5' CCWGG; 3' GGWCC	5' ---CC WGG--- 3'; 3' ---GGW CC--- 5'	AorI, BseBI, Bse24I, BstNI, BstOI, Bst2UI, BthDI, **EcoRII**, MvaI
CciNI		Curtobacterium citreus	5' GCGGCCGC; 3' CGCCGGCG	5' ---GC GGCCGC--- 3'; 3' ---CGCCGG CG--- 5'
CcoI		Clostridium coccoides B-2	5' GCCGGC; 3' CGGCCG	5' ---GCC GGC--- 3'; 3' ---CGG CCG--- 5'
CcrI		Caulobacter crescentus CB-13	5' CTCGAG; 3' GAGCTC	5' ---C TCGAG--- 3'; 3' ---GAGCT C--- 5'
CcuI		Chroococcidiopsis cubana	5' GGNCC; 3' CCNGG	5' ---G GNCC--- 3'; 3' ---CCNG G--- 5'	AsuI, Bal228I, BavBII, BsiZI, BspF4I, Cfr13I, Nsp7121I, PspPI
CcyI		Clostridium cylindrosporum	5' GATC; 3' CTAG	5' --- GATC--- 3'; 3' ---CTAG --- 5'	BfuCI, Bsp67I, Bst19II, CviAI, FnuCI, MboI, NmeCI, SauMI
CdiI		Citrobacter freundii RFL2	5' CATCG; 3' GTAGC	5' ---CATC G--- 3'; 3' ---GTAG C--- 5'
CelI		Citrobacter freundii RFL6	5' GGATCC; 3' CCTAGG	5' ---G GATCC--- 3'; 3' ---CCTAG G--- 5'	AliI, ApaCI, AsiI, BamHI, CelI, NspSAIV, RspLKII, SolI, Uba4009I
CelII		Coccochloris elabens 17a	5' GCTNAGC; 3' CGANTCG	5' ---GC TNAGC--- 3'; 3' ---CGANT CG--- 5'
CeqI		Corynebacterium equi	5' GATATC; 3' CTATAG	5' ---GAT ATC--- 3'; 3' ---CTA TAG--- 5'
CflI		Cellulomonas flavigena	5' CTGCAG; 3' GACGTC	5' ---CTGCA G--- 3'; 3' ---G ACGTC--- 5'	AjoI, BloHII, CflI, CstI, Ecl37kI, PaePI, PstI, SalPI, Srl5DI, Sst12I
CfoI		Clostridium formicoaceticum	5' GCGC; 3' CGCG	5' ---GCG C--- 3'; 3' ---C GCG--- 5'	AspLEI, BspLAI, BstHHI, FnuDIII, HhaI, **HinP1I**, **HsoI**, **HspAI**, **SciNI**
CfrI		Citrobacter freundii RFL2	5' YGGCCR; 3' RCCGGY	5' ---Y GGCCR--- 3'; 3' ---RCCGG Y--- 5'
Cfr6I		Citrobacter freundii RFL6	5' CAGCTG; 3' GTCGAC	5' ---CAG CTG--- 3'; 3' ---GTC GAC--- 5'
Cfr9I		Citrobacter freundii	5' CCCGGG; 3' GGGCCC	5' ---C CCGGG--- 3'; 3' ---GGGCC C--- 5'	AhyI, EaeAI, EclRI, Pac25I, PspAI, TspMI, XcyI, XmaI, XmaCI
Cfr10I	1CFR	Citrobacter freundii RFL10	5' RCCGGY; 3' YGGCCR	5' ---R CCGGY--- 3'; 3' ---YGGCC R--- 5'
Cfr13I		Citrobacter freundii RFL13	5' GGNCC; 3' CCNGG	5' ---G GNCC--- 3'; 3' ---CCNG G--- 5'	AsuI, Bal228I, BavBII, BsiZI, BspF4I, **FmuI**, Nsp7121I, PspPI
Cfr42I		Citrobacter freundii RFL42	5' CCGCGG; 3' GGCGCC	5' ---CCGC GG--- 3'; 3' ---GG CGCC--- 5'	SacII, CscI, HgaI
CfrA4I		Citrobacter freundii A4	5' CTGCAG; 3' GACGTC	5' ---CTGCA G--- 3'; 3' ---G ACGTC--- 5'	AjoI, BloHII, CflI, CstI, Ecl2zI, PaePI, PstI, SalPI, Srl5DI, Sst12I
CfrBI		Citrobacter freundii 4111	5' CCWWGG; 3' GGWWCC	5' ---C CWWGG--- 3'; 3' ---GGWWC C--- 5'
CfrJ4I		Citrobacter freundii J4	5' CCCGGG; 3' GGGCCC	5' ---CCC GGG--- 3'; 3' ---GGG CCC--- 5'	AhyI, **CfrJ4I**, EaeAI, EclRI, Pac25I, **SmaI**, TspMI, XcyI, XmaI
CfuI		Caulobacter fusiformis BC-25	5' GATC; 3' CTAG	5' ---GA TC--- 3'; 3' ---CT AG--- 5'
CfuII		Caulobacter fusiformis BC-25	5' CTGCAG; 3' GACGTC	5' ---CTGCA G--- 3'; 3' ---G ACGTC--- 5'	AjoI, AliAJI, CfuII, HalII, PaePI, Psp23I, PstI, SalPI, Srl5DI, YenI
ChaI		Corynebacterium halofytica	5' GATC; 3' CTAG	5' ---GATC --- 3'; 3' --- CTAG--- 5'	**BfuCI**, **Bsp2095I**, **BspKT6I BtkII**, **FnuCI**, **MboI**, **NmeCI**, **SsiAI**
CjeI		Campylobacter jejuni P37	5' CCAN_{6}GT; 3' GGTN_{6}CA	5' ---CCAN_{6}GTN_{8}NNNNNNN --- 3'; 3' ---GGTN_{6}CAN_{8}N NNNNNN--- 5'	— None in May 2010 —
CjePI		Campylobacter jejuni P116	5' CCAN_{7}TC; 3' GGTN_{7}AG	5' ---CCAN_{7}TCN_{7}NNNNNNN --- 3'; 3' ---GGTN_{7}AGN_{7}N NNNNNN--- 5'	— None in May 2010 —
ClaI		Caryophanon latum L	5' ATCGAT; 3' TAGCTA	5' ---AT CGAT--- 3'; 3' ---TAGC TA--- 5'	AagI, BanIII, BavCI, Bsa29I, BseCI, BspDI, Bsu15I, BsuTUI
CltI		Caryophanon latum	5' GGCC; 3' CCGG	5' ---GG CC--- 3'; 3' ---CC GG--- 5'
CpfI		Clostridium perfringens	5' GATC; 3' CTAG	5' --- GATC--- 3'; 3' ---CTAG --- 5'	AspMDI, Bsp67I, Bst19II, CcyI, FnuCI, MboI, NphI, SauMI
CpoI		Caseobacter polymorphus	5' CGGWCCG; 3' GCCWGGC	5' ---CG GWCCG--- 3'; 3' ---GCCWG GC--- 5'
CscI		Calothrix scopulorum	5' CCGCGG; 3' GGCGCC	5' ---CCGC GG--- 3'; 3' ---GG CGCC--- 5'	Cfr42I, SacII, HgaI
CsiAI		Corynebacterium sp. A	5' ACCGGT; 3' TGGCCA	5' ---A CCGGT--- 3'; 3' ---TGGCC A--- 5'	AgeI, AsiAI, / AsiGI, / BshTI; CspAI, PinAI
CsiBI		Corynebacterium sp. B	5' GCGGCCGC; 3' CGCCGGCG	5' ---GC GGCCGC--- 3'; 3' ---CGCCGG CG--- 5'
CspI		Corynebacterium sp.	5' CGGWCCG; 3' GCCWGGC	5' ---CG GWCCG--- 3'; 3' ---GCCWG GC--- 5'
Csp6I		Corynebacterium sp. RFL6	5' GTAC; 3' CATG	5' ---G TAC--- 3'; 3' ---CAT G--- 5'	**AfaI**, CviQI, CviRII, **HpyBI**, PabI, **PlaAII**, **RsaI**, RsaNI,
Csp45I		Clostridium sporogenes	5' TTCGAA; 3' AAGCTT	5' ---TT CGAA--- 3'; 3' ---AAGC TT--- 5'	Asp10HI, Bim19I, BsiCI, BspT104I, FspII, LspI, NspV, SspRFI
CspAI		Corynebacterium sp. 301	5' ACCGGT; 3' TGGCCA	5' ---A CCGGT--- 3'; 3' ---TGGCC A--- 5'	AgeI, AsiAI, / AsiGI, / BshTI; CsiAI, PinAI
CspBI		Corynebacterium sp. B	5' GCGGCCGC; 3' CGCCGGCG	5' ---GC GGCCGC--- 3'; 3' ---CGCCGG CG--- 5'
CspCI		Citrobacter sp. 2144	5' CAAN_{4}NGTGG; 3' GTTN_{4}NCACC	5' ---CAAN_{5}GTGGN_{8}NNNN --- 3'; 3' ---GTTN_{5}CACCN_{8}NN NN--- 5'	— None in May 2010 —
Csp68KI		Cyanothece sp. BH68K	5' GGWCC; 3' CCWGG	5' ---G GWCC--- 3'; 3' ---CCWG G--- 5'	BamNxI, BcuAI, BsrAI, Eco47I, FspMSI, HgiCII, Kzo49I, SmuEI
Csp68KII		Cyanothece sp. BH68K	5' TTCGAA; 3' AAGCTT	5' ---TT CGAA--- 3'; 3' ---AAGC TT--- 5'	Asp10HI, Bim19I, BsiCI, BstBI, Csp45I, LspI, PlaII, SviI
Csp68KIII		Cyanothece sp. BH68K	5' ATGCAT; 3' TACGTA	5' ---ATGCA T--- 3'; 3' ---T ACGTA--- 5'	BfrBI, EcoT22I, Mph1103I, NsiI, PinBI, Ppu10I, SspD5II, Zsp2I
Csp68KVI		Cyanothece sp. BH68K	5' CGCG; 3' GCGC	5' ---CG CG--- 3'; 3' ---GC GC--- 5'	BepI, Bpu95I, Bsp123I, BstFNI, BstUI, BtkI, FalII, **SelI**, ThaI
CspKVI		Cyanothece sp. BH68K	5' CGCG; 3' GCGC	5' ---CG CG--- 3'; 3' ---GC GC--- 5'
CstI		Clostridium sticklandii	5' CTGCAG; 3' GACGTC	5' ---CTGCA G--- 3'; 3' ---G ACGTC--- 5'	AjoI, AliAJI, CfrA4I, HalII, MhaAI, Pfl21I, PstI, SflI, Srl5DI, YenI
CstMI		Corynebacterium striatum M82B	5' AAGGAG; 3' TTCCTC	5' ---AAGGAGN_{17}NNN --- 3'; 3' ---TTCCTCN_{17}N NN--- 5'	— None in May 2010 —
CthII		Clostridium thermocellum	5' CCWGG; 3' GGWCC	5' ---CC WGG--- 3'; 3' ---GGW CC--- 5'	ApaORI, BseBI, Bse24I, Bst2UI, BstNI, BstM6I, **EcoRII**, MvaI
CviAI		Chlorella NC64A (PBCV-1)	5' GATC; 3' CTAG	5' --- GATC--- 3'; 3' ---CTAG --- 5'	Bme12I, Bsp67I, Bst19II, CcyI, FnuCI, MgoI, NphI, SauMI
CviAII		Chlorella NC64A (PBCV-1)	5' CATG; 3' GTAC	5' ---C ATG--- 3'; 3' ---GTA C--- 5'
CviBI		Chlorella NC64A (NC-1A)	5' GANTC; 3' CTNAG	5' ---G ANTC--- 3'; 3' ---CTNA G--- 5'
CviJI		Chlorella NC64A (IL-3A)	5' RGCY; 3' YCGR	5' ---RG CY--- 3'; 3' ---YC GR--- 5'
CviQI		Chlorella NC64A (NY-2A)	5' GTAC; 3' CATG	5' ---G TAC--- 3'; 3' ---CAT G--- 5'	**AfaI**, Csp6I, CviRII, **HpyBI**, PabI, **PlaAII**, **RsaI**, RsaNI,
CviRI		Chlorella NC64A (XZ-6E)	5' TGCA; 3' ACGT	5' ---TG CA--- 3'; 3' ---AC GT--- 5'
CviRII		Chlorella NC64A (XZ-6E)	5' GTAC; 3' CATG	5' ---G TAC--- 3'; 3' ---CAT G--- 5'	**AfaI**, Csp6I, CviQI, **HpyBI**, PabI, **PlaAII**, **RsaI**, RsaNI,
CviTI		Chlorella NC64A (CA-1A)	5' RGCY; 3' YCGR	5' ---RG CY--- 3'; 3' ---YC GR--- 5'
CvnI		Chromatium vinosum	5' CCTNAGG; 3' GGANTCC	5' ---CC TNAGG--- 3'; 3' ---GGANT CC--- 5'	AocI, AxyI, Bse21I, Bsu36I, Eco81I, MstII, SauI, SshAI

=== D ===
**Enzyme**	**PDB code**	Source	**Recognition sequence**	**Cut**	**Isoschizomers**
DdeI		Desulfovibrio desulfuricans	5' CTNAG; 3' GANTC	5' ---C TNAG--- 3'; 3' ---GANT C--- 5'	BstDEI, / HpyF3I
DmaI		Deleya marina	5' CAGCTG; 3' GTCGAC	5' ---CAG CTG--- 3'; 3' ---GTC GAC--- 5'
DpaI		Deleya pacifica	5' AGTACT; 3' TCATGA	5' ---AGT ACT--- 3'; 3' ---TCA TGA--- 5'	Acc113I, AssI, / BmcAI, Bpa34I, Eco255I, RflFII, ScaI, ZrmI
DpnI		Diplococcus pneumoniae G41	5' GATC; 3' CTAG	5' ---GA TC--- 3'; 3' ---CT AG--- 5'
DpnII		Diplococcus pneumoniae G41	5' GATC; 3' CTAG	5' --- GATC--- 3'; 3' ---CTAG --- 5'	AspMDI, Bsp105I, BspFI, BstMBI, CpfI, Kzo9I, NdeII, Sth368I
DraI		Deinococcus radiophilus	5' TTTAAA; 3' AAATTT	5' ---TTT AAA--- 3'; 3' ---AAA TTT--- 5'	AhaIII, PauAII, SruI
DraII		Deinococcus radiophilus	5' RGGNCCY; 3' YCCNGGR	5' ---RG GNCCY--- 3'; 3' ---YCCNG GR--- 5'
DraIII		Deinococcus radiophilus	5' CACNNNGTG; 3' GTGNNNCAC	5' ---CACNNN GTG--- 3'; 3' ---GTG NNNCAC--- 5'	AdeI, BstIZ316I
DrdI		Deinococcus radiodurans	5' GACN_{6}GTC; 3' CTGN_{6}CAG	5' ---GACNNNN NNGTC--- 3'; 3' ---CTGNN NNNNCAG--- 5'	AasI, DseDI
DriI		Dactylococcopsis salina	5' GACN_{5}GTC; 3' CTGN_{5}CAG	5' ---GACNNN NNGTC--- 3'; 3' ---CTGNN NNNCAG--- 5'	AhdI, AspEI, / BmeRI, / BspOVI, Eam1105I, EclHKI, NruGI
DsaI		Dactylococcopsis salina	5' CCRYGG; 3' GGYRCC	5' ---C CRYGG--- 3'; 3' ---GGYRC C--- 5'
DsaII		Dactylococcopsis salina	5' GGCC; 3' CCGG	5' ---GG CC--- 3'; 3' ---CC GG--- 5'
DsaIII		Dactylococcopsis salina	5' RGATCY; 3' YCTAGR	5' ---R GATCY--- 3'; 3' ---YCTAG R--- 5'
DsaIV		Dactylococcopsis salina	5' GGWCC; 3' CCWGG	5' ---G GWCC--- 3'; 3' ---CCWG G--- 5'	BamNxI, BcuAI, BsrAI, Eco47I, FspMSI, HgiEI, Kzo49I, SmuEI
DsaV		Dactylococcopsis salina	5' CCNGG; 3' GGNCC	5' --- CCNGG--- 3'; 3' ---GGNCC --- 5'
DseDI		Deinococcus sp. Dx	5' GACN_{6}GTC; 3' CTGN_{6}CAG	5' ---GACNNNN NNGTC--- 3'; 3' ---CTGNN NNNNCAG--- 5'	AasI, DrdI
