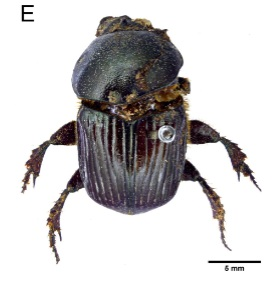

Scientific classification
- Kingdom: Animalia
- Phylum: Arthropoda
- Class: Insecta
- Order: Coleoptera
- Suborder: Polyphaga
- Infraorder: Scarabaeiformia
- Family: Scarabaeidae
- Genus: Onitis
- Species: O. philemon

Binomial name
- Onitis philemon Fabricius, 1801

Synonyms
- Onitis distinctus Lansberge, 1875; Onitis minor Lansberge, 1875

= Onitis philemon =

Species of beetle

Onitis philemon is a species of dung beetle found in India, Sri Lanka, China and Taiwan.

== Description ==
This oval less elongate and convex species has an average length of about 14 to 19 mm. Body greenish, coppery or bronzy-black. Head rugulose, with smooth ocular lobes. Clypeus parabolic, with an extremely feeble emargination of the front edge in the middle. Pronotum fairly strongly closely but unevenly punctured. Elytra moderately strongly striate with very finely and sparsely punctured intervals. Pygidium very feebly and sparsely punctured. Metasternal shield smooth and feebly punctured. Male has granulate clypeus, elongate front legs, slender tibia with four feeble teeth externally. Female has closely transversely rugose clypeus, broad front tibia with four strong teeth and an articulated terminal spur.

Adult beetle is a tunneler and main food source is cow dung. After observing the gut of the beetle, several symbiotic microbes have been identified who has the ability to degrade cellulose, pectin and lignin. Cellulose degraders are Acinetobacter baumannii, Citrobacter amalonaticus, Citrobacter freundii, Aeromonas caviae and Acinetobacter. Pectine hydrolyzing microbes are Aeromonas hydrophila, Aeromonas caviae and Citrobacter freundii. Two bacterial species: Citrobacter amalonaticus and Citrobacter freundii are known to digest lignin.
