= C3H8O2 =

The molecular formula C_{3}H_{8}O_{2} may refer to:

- Dimethoxymethane
- 2-Methoxyethanol
- Propanediol
  - 1,2-Propanediol (propylene glycol), a vicinal diol
  - 1,3-Propanediol (trimethylene glycol)
  - 1,1-Propanediol (geminal diol)
  - 2,2-Propanediol (geminal diol)

== See also ==
- Diol (Glycol)
  - Geminal diol
  - Vicinal diol
