= DPNI =

DPNI may refer to:

- Movement Against Illegal Immigration
- DpnI, a Type IIM restriction enzyme which digests methylated DNA
