= Citrobacter sedlakii =

Scientific classification
- Domain: Bacteria
- Kingdom: Pseudomonadati
- Phylum: Pseudomonadota
- Class: Gammaproteobacteria
- Order: Enterobacterales
- Family: Enterobacteriaceae
- Genus: Citrobacter
- Species: C. sedlakii

Binomial name
- Citrobacter sedlakii Brenner et al. 1993

Species of bacterium

Citrobacter sedlakii is a species of Gram-negative bacteria. It has been described as causing human disease, but is generally found as a non-pathogenic organism in human stools.

== History ==
Citrobacter sedlakii was originally isolated from human stool and wounds as strains of Citrobacter freundii. However, in 1993 six strains of C. freundii were identified as a separate species based on DNA hybridization, and were named C. sedlakii to honor Czech microbiologist Jiri Sedlak.

== Description ==
Citrobacter sedlakii is a rod-shaped gram-negative bacterium. It can be distinguished from other Citrobacter species by its ability to produce indole, arginine dihydrolase activity, and ornithine decarboxylase activity.

== Role in disease ==
Citrobacter sedlakii was originally isolated from human stool and wounds and was suggested to be pathogenic in humans. While some reports have described C. sedlakii as causing illness in humans, it is frequently found in stool and is not thought to be pathogenic in most cases. C. sedlakii can express the O157 antigen which is commonly found on pathogenic E. coli, however this does not cause disease.
