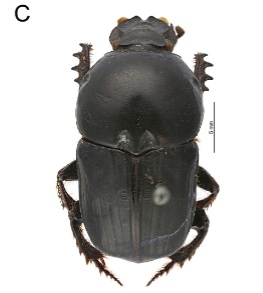

Scientific classification
- Kingdom: Animalia
- Phylum: Arthropoda
- Class: Insecta
- Order: Coleoptera
- Suborder: Polyphaga
- Infraorder: Scarabaeiformia
- Family: Scarabaeidae
- Genus: Onitis
- Species: O. lama

Binomial name
- Onitis lama Lansberge, 1875

= Onitis lama =

Species of beetle

Onitis lama is a species of beetle of the Scarabaeidae family. This species is found in India (Andhra Pradesh, Gujarat, Haryana, Himachal Pradesh, Maharashtra, Punjab, Rajasthan, Tamil Nadu, Uttarakhand, Uttar Pradesh), Nepal and Pakistan.

== Description ==
Adults reach a length of about 19–24 mm (0.75–0.94 in). Their body is black and shining.
