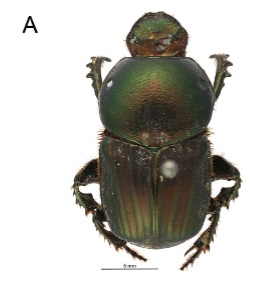

Scientific classification
- Kingdom: Animalia
- Phylum: Arthropoda
- Class: Insecta
- Order: Coleoptera
- Suborder: Polyphaga
- Infraorder: Scarabaeiformia
- Family: Scarabaeidae
- Genus: Onitis
- Species: O. singhalensis

Binomial name
- Onitis singhalensis Lansberge, 1875

= Onitis singhalensis =

Species of beetle

Onitis singhalensis, is a species of dung beetle found in India, Sri Lanka, and Pakistan.

== Description ==
Coppery or greenish-coppery, not very shining. Length is 19–22 mm, and breadth is 10–12 mm.

== Distribution ==
India (Gujarat, Karnataka, Kerala, Rajasthan, Tamil Nadu), Sri Lanka, Pakistan, Nepal
