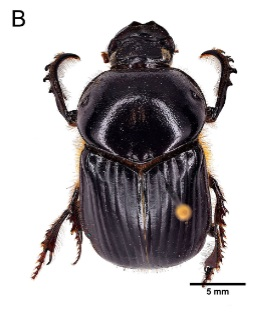

Scientific classification
- Kingdom: Animalia
- Phylum: Arthropoda
- Class: Insecta
- Order: Coleoptera
- Suborder: Polyphaga
- Infraorder: Scarabaeiformia
- Family: Scarabaeidae
- Genus: Onitis
- Species: O. brahma

Binomial name
- Onitis brahma Lansberge, 1875

= Onitis brahma =

Species of beetle

Onitis brahma is a species of dung beetle in the family Scarabaeidae. It is only known from India but fairly widespread in peninsular India.

== Etymology ==
Lansberge mentions in the description that the name brahma as proposed by Mr. Reiche (on specimen label?) was maintained.

== Description ==
Black or dark chestnut brown. Length is 21–26 mm, and breadth is 11–13.5 mm.

== Distribution ==
India (Andhra Pradesh, Chhattisgarh, Gujarat, Karnataka, Madhya Pradesh, Maharashtra, Rajasthan, Tamil Nadu)
