= Citrobacter pasteurii =

Scientific classification
- Domain: Bacteria
- Kingdom: Pseudomonadati
- Phylum: Pseudomonadota
- Class: Gammaproteobacteria
- Order: Enterobacterales
- Family: Enterobacteriaceae
- Genus: Citrobacter
- Species: C. pasteurii

Binomial name
- Citrobacter pasteurii Clermont et al. 2015

Type strain
- CIP 55.13, CIP 55.9, DSM 28879, Na 1a

Species of bacterium

Citrobacter pasteurii is a bacterium from the genus Citrobacter which has been isolated from human feces in Kentucky in the United States.
