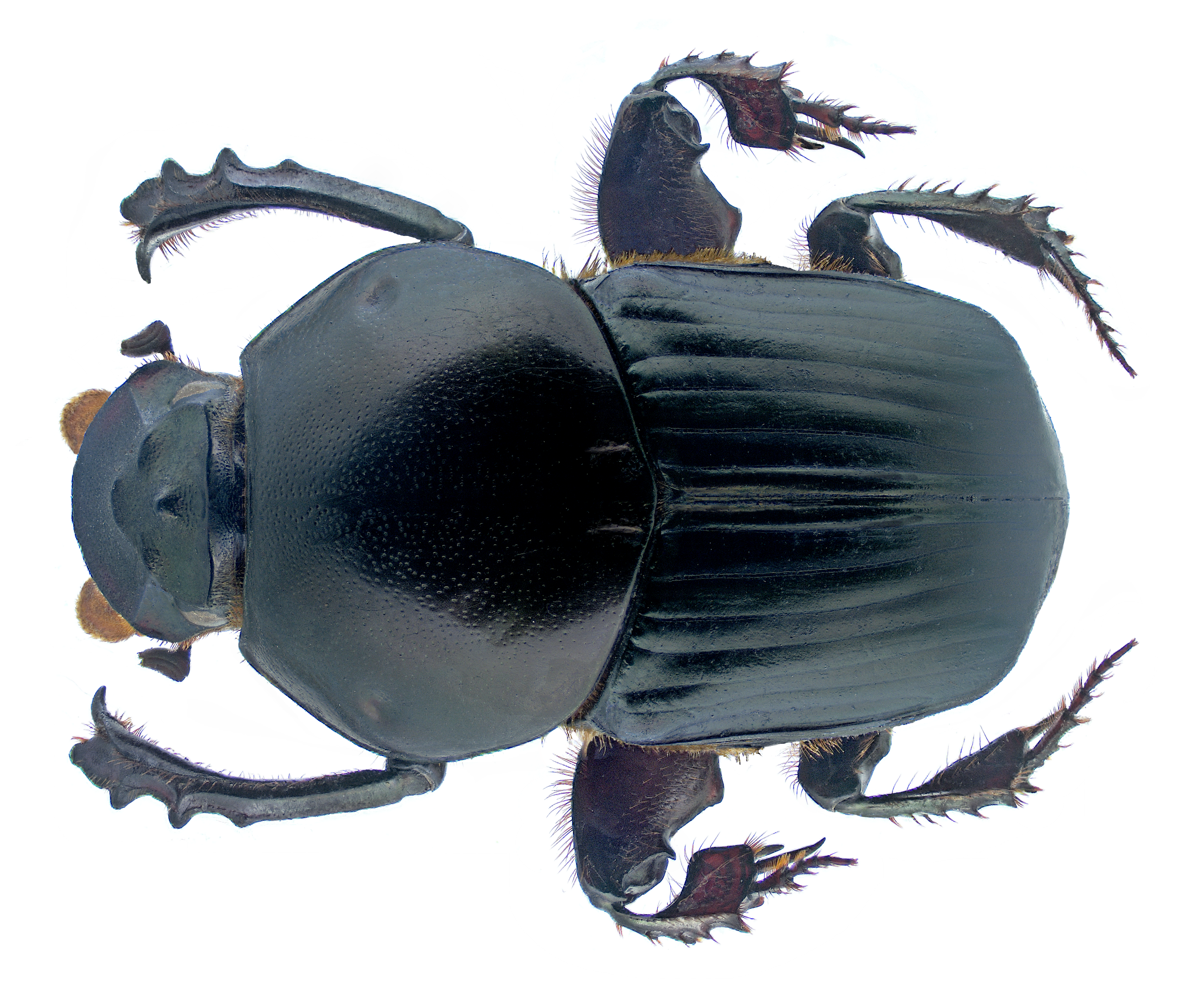

Scientific classification
- Kingdom: Animalia
- Phylum: Arthropoda
- Class: Insecta
- Order: Coleoptera
- Suborder: Polyphaga
- Infraorder: Scarabaeiformia
- Family: Scarabaeidae
- Genus: Onitis
- Species: O. subopacus

Binomial name
- Onitis subopacus Arrow, 1931

Synonyms
- Onitis philemon Lansberge, 1875 (nec Fabricius)

= Onitis subopacus =

Species of beetle

Onitis subopacus is a species of dung beetle found in Austro-Oriental, Oriental, South and West Palearctic regions.

== Distribution ==
It is found in India (Arunachal Pradesh, Assam, Bihar, Chhattisgarh, Gujarat, Haryana, Himachal Pradesh, Jammu and Kashmir, Jharkhand, Karnataka, Kerala, Madhya Pradesh, Maharashtra, Meghalaya, Nagaland, New Delhi, Punjab, Rajasthan, Tamil Nadu, Tripura, Uttarakhand, Uttar Pradesh, West Bengal), Sri Lanka, Pakistan, Myanmar, Thailand, China, Afghanistan, Nepal, Vietnam, Cambodia and Sunda Islands.

== Description ==
Adults are often found in cow dung and buffalo dung.
