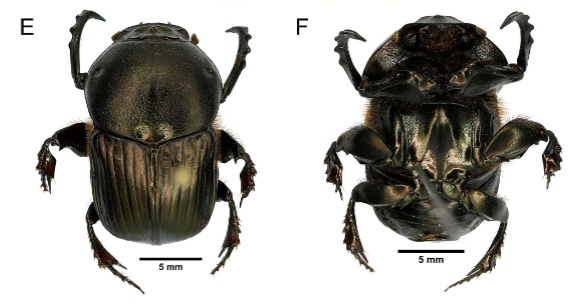

Scientific classification
- Kingdom: Animalia
- Phylum: Arthropoda
- Class: Insecta
- Order: Coleoptera
- Suborder: Polyphaga
- Infraorder: Scarabaeiformia
- Family: Scarabaeidae
- Genus: Onitis
- Species: O. visthara

Binomial name
- Onitis visthara Karimbumkara & Priyadarsanan, 2024

= Onitis visthara =

Species of beetle

Onitis visthara is a species of dung beetle in the family Scarabaeidae. It is only known from its type locality in the outskirts of Bengaluru in Karnataka state of India.

== Etymology ==
In this species, the measurements of the pronotal and elytral measurements are almost the same as each other, giving it a broader rectangular appearance, as compared with other species, thus the name visthara which means 'expanse' in Sanskrit.
