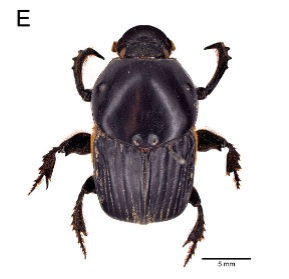

Scientific classification
- Kingdom: Animalia
- Phylum: Arthropoda
- Class: Insecta
- Order: Coleoptera
- Suborder: Polyphaga
- Infraorder: Scarabaeiformia
- Family: Scarabaeidae
- Genus: Onitis
- Species: O. excavatus

Binomial name
- Onitis excavatus Arrow, 1931

= Onitis excavatus =

Species of beetle

Onitis excavatus is a species of dung beetle in the family Scarabaeidae described using male specimen collected by E. T. Atkinson collected from Tenasserim in Myanmar.

== Description ==
Black and shining. Length is 25 mm, and breadth is 13 mm.

== Distribution ==
India (Arunachal Pradesh, Assam, Himachal Pradesh, Meghalaya, Nagaland, Uttarakhand, Uttar Pradesh), China, Myanmar, Nepal, Pakistan, Taiwan, Thailand, Vietnam
