= Citrobacter europaeus =

Scientific classification
- Domain: Bacteria
- Kingdom: Pseudomonadati
- Phylum: Pseudomonadota
- Class: Gammaproteobacteria
- Order: Enterobacterales
- Family: Enterobacteriaceae
- Genus: Citrobacter
- Species: C. europaeus

Binomial name
- Citrobacter europaeus Ribeiro et al. 2017

Type strain
- CIP 106467, DSM 103031, strain 97/79

Species of bacterium

Citrobacter europaeus is a bacterium from the genus of Citrobacter which has been isolated from human feces in Réunion in France.
