= Citrobacter portucalensis =

Scientific classification
- Domain: Bacteria
- Kingdom: Pseudomonadati
- Phylum: Pseudomonadota
- Class: Gammaproteobacteria
- Order: Enterobacterales
- Family: Enterobacteriaceae
- Genus: Citrobacter
- Species group: Citrobacter freundii complex
- Species: C. portucalensis

Binomial name
- Citrobacter portucalensis Ribeiro et al. 2017

Species of bacterium

Citrobacter portucalensis is a bacterium in the genus Citrobacter which has been isolated from a water well sample in Portugal.
