= Citrobacter farmeri =

Scientific classification
- Domain: Bacteria
- Kingdom: Pseudomonadati
- Phylum: Pseudomonadota
- Class: Gammaproteobacteria
- Order: Enterobacterales
- Family: Enterobacteriaceae
- Genus: Citrobacter
- Species: C. farmeri

Binomial name
- Citrobacter farmeri Brenner et al. 1993

Species of bacterium

Citrobacter farmeri is a Gram-negative species of bacteria.
