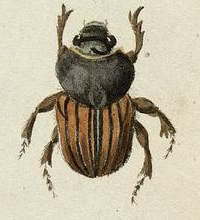
- Onitis humerosus

Scientific classification
- Kingdom: Animalia
- Phylum: Arthropoda
- Class: Insecta
- Order: Coleoptera
- Suborder: Polyphaga
- Infraorder: Scarabaeiformia
- Family: Scarabaeidae
- Subfamily: Scarabaeinae
- Tribe: Onitini
- Genus: Onitis; Fabricius, 1798

= Onitis =

Genus of beetles

Onitis is a genus of Scarabaeidae or scarab beetles in the superfamily Scarabaeoidea and typical of the tribe Onitini. This genus is mainly distributed in Africa, Palaearctic and Oriental region with more than 140 species from the Afrotropical region. All species of this genus are tunnellers meaning they build tunnel under the dung in the soil and bring dung in the tunnel to lay eggs.

== Species ==
Species within this genus include:.

- Onitis abyssinicus
- Onitis adelphus
- Onitis adriani
- Onitis aeneomicans
- Onitis aeneus
- Onitis aerarius
- Onitis aeruginosus
- Onitis aethiops
- Onitis affinis
- Onitis alexis
- Onitis androcles
- Onitis anthracinus
- Onitis archettii
- Onitis artuosus
- Onitis assamensis
- Onitis autumnalis
- Onitis aygulus
- Onitis bayanga
- Onitis belial
- Onitis bhomorensis
- Onitis bilobatus
- Onitis bispicticollis
- Onitis bocandei
- Onitis bordati
- Onitis brahma
- Onitis bredoi
- Onitis brevidens
- Onitis caffer
- Onitis cambeforti
- Onitis camerunus
- Onitis castaneus
- Onitis cerrutii
- Onitis chalceus
- Onitis confusus
- Onitis corydon
- Onitis coxalis
- Onitis crassus
- Onitis crenatus
- Onitis cribratus
- Onitis cryptodus
- Onitis cupreus
- Onitis curvipes
- Onitis damoetas
- Onitis deceptor
- Onitis denticoxa
- Onitis dimidiatus
- Onitis dispar
- Onitis endroedii
- Onitis excavatus
- Onitis ezechias
- Onitis fabricii
- Onitis falcatus
- Onitis feae
- Onitis fractipes
- Onitis fulgidus
- Onitis fulmineus
- Onitis gazanus
- Onitis gilleti
- Onitis granicollis
- Onitis granulisetosus
- Onitis guineensis
- Onitis hageni
- Onitis humerosus
- Onitis inflaticollis
- Onitis insuetus
- Onitis intermedius
- Onitis inversidens
- Onitis ion
- Onitis janssenii
- Onitis jeanneli
- Onitis jossoi
- Onitis keniensis
- Onitis kethai
- Onitis kingstoni
- Onitis lama
- Onitis laminosus
- Onitis lamnifer
- Onitis lansbergei
- Onitis laticollis
- Onitis licitus
- Onitis lobi
- Onitis lobipes
- Onitis lognia
- Onitis longitibialis
- Onitis ludekingi
- Onitis lycophron
- Onitis malleatus
- Onitis marshalli
- Onitis mendax
- Onitis menieri
- Onitis meruensis
- Onitis meyeri
- Onitis miesseni
- Onitis minutus
- Onitis mniszechi
- Onitis mniszechianus
- Onitis monstrosus
- Onitis mossambicensis
- Onitis multidentatus
- Onitis naviauxi
- Onitis nemoralis
- Onitis niger
- Onitis nigeriensis
- Onitis nubiensis
- Onitis numida
- Onitis obenbergeri
- Onitis obscurus
- Onitis occidentalis
- Onitis orthopus
- Onitis overlaeti
- Onitis paraconfusus
- Onitis parainflaticollis
- Onitis paramniszechi
- Onitis parvulus
- Onitis pecuarius
- Onitis perbrincki
- Onitis perpunctatus
- Onitis pers
- Onitis perturbator
- Onitis phartopus
- Onitis philemon
- Onitis picticollis
- Onitis pinheyi
- Onitis podicinus
- Onitis politus
- Onitis popei
- Onitis proximus
- Onitis pseudojansenii
- Onitis pseudoorthopus
- Onitis pseudosetosus
- Onitis pumilio
- Onitis punctatostriatus
- Onitis pyramus
- Onitis reichei
- Onitis retrodentatus
- Onitis ringenbachi
- Onitis robustus
- Onitis rothi
- Onitis senegalensis
- Onitis setosus
- Onitis shoensis
- Onitis sibutensis
- Onitis similis
- Onitis singhalensis
- Onitis siva
- Onitis sphinx
- Onitis spinicrus
- Onitis spinipes
- Onitis subcrenatus
- Onitis subopacus
- Onitis sulcipennis
- Onitis tanzaniensis
- Onitis thalassinus
- Onitis thoracicus
- Onitis tingaudi
- Onitis tortuosus
- Onitis trochantericus
- Onitis tumidus
- Onitis uncinatoides
- Onitis uncinatus
- Onitis unguiculatus
- Onitis upembanus
- Onitis vanderkelleni
- Onitis westermanni
- Onitis vicinus
- Onitis violaceus
- Onitis virens
- Onitis viridulus
- Onitis visthara
- Onitis wittei
- Onitis vrydaghi
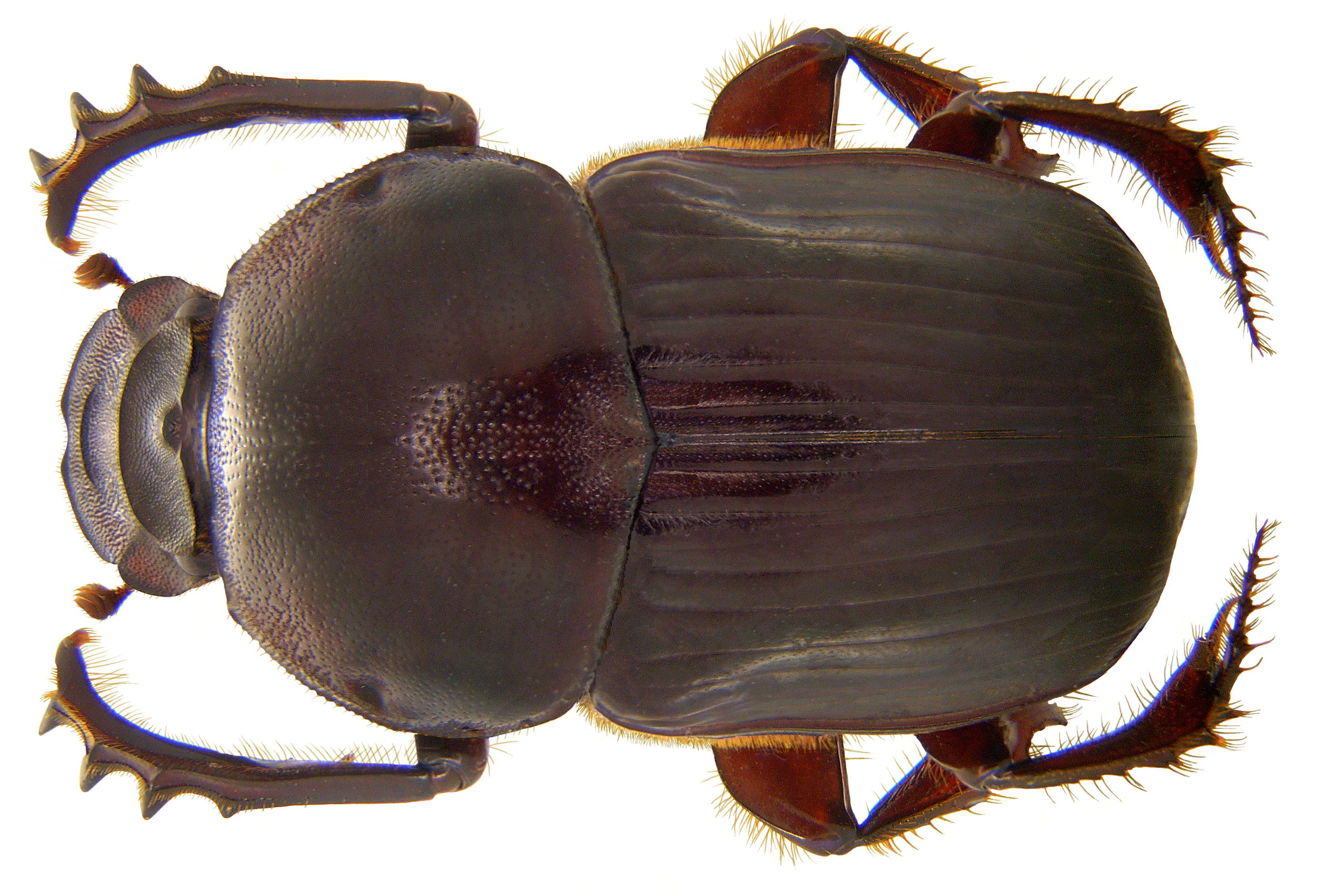
Onitis keniensis
