= Onitis crenatus =

Scientific classification
- Kingdom: Animalia
- Phylum: Arthropoda
- Class: Insecta
- Order: Coleoptera
- Suborder: Polyphaga
- Infraorder: Scarabaeiformia
- Family: Scarabaeidae
- Genus: Onitis
- Species: O. crenatus

Binomial name
- Onitis crenatus Reiche, 1847

Synonyms
- Onitis herbsti Roth, 1851

Species of beetle

Onitis crenatus, is a species of dung beetle found in Afro-Asian countries.
