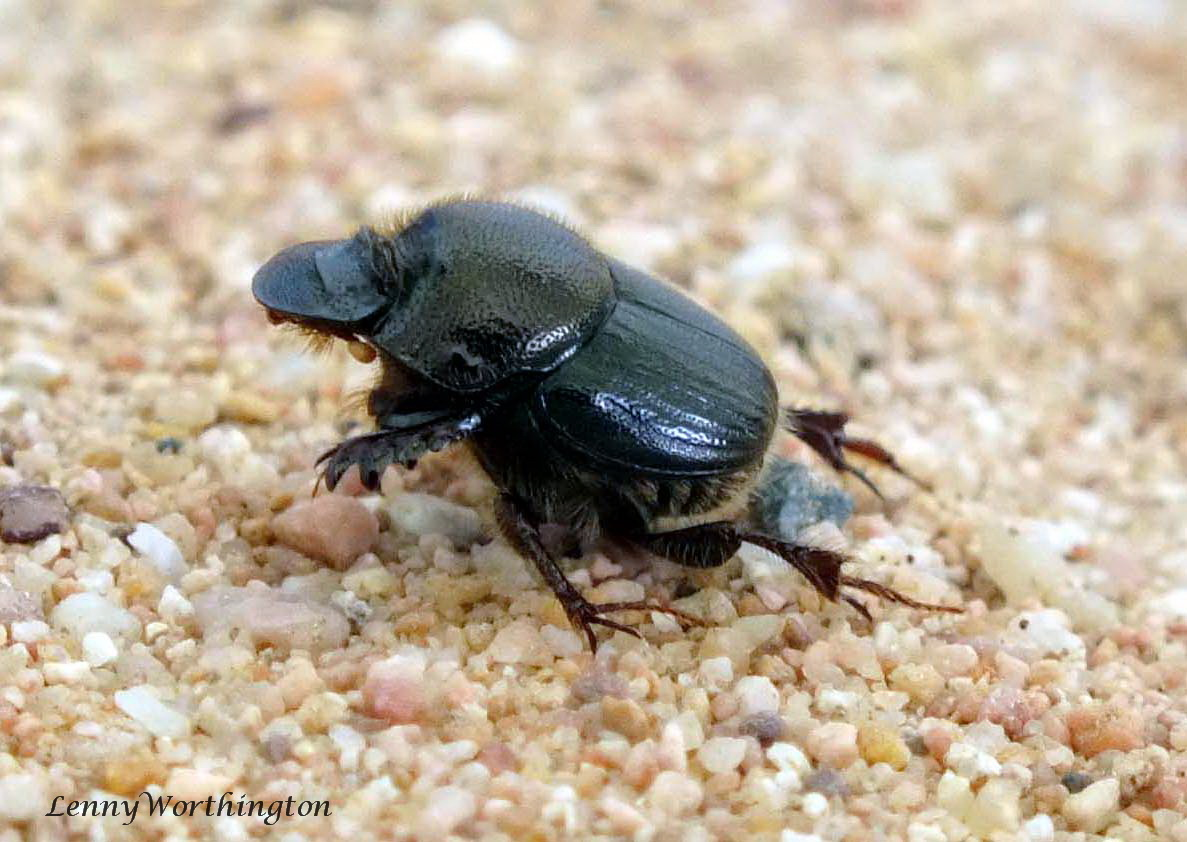

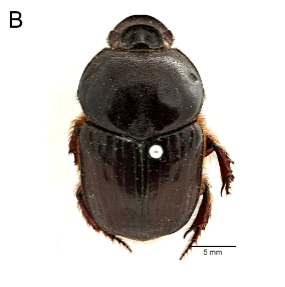

Scientific classification
- Kingdom: Animalia
- Phylum: Arthropoda
- Class: Insecta
- Order: Coleoptera
- Suborder: Polyphaga
- Infraorder: Scarabaeiformia
- Family: Scarabaeidae
- Genus: Onitis
- Species: O. siva

Binomial name
- Onitis siva Gillet, 1911

= Onitis siva =

Species of beetle

Onitis siva is a species of dung beetle in the family Scarabaeidae described from southern India is only known from India so far.

== Description ==
Black or very deep reddish-black. Length is 30 mm, and breadth is 16 mm.

== Distribution ==
The species inhabits the Indian states of Arunachal Pradesh, Karnataka, Kerala, Gujarat, Rajasthan, Tamil Nadu, and Uttar Pradesh.
