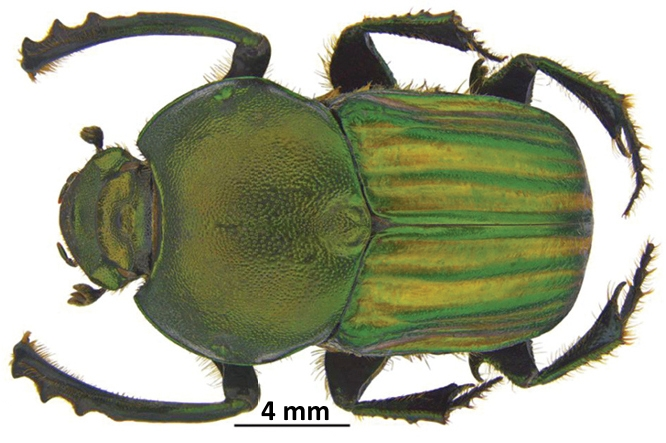
- Onitis humerosus

Scientific classification
- Domain: Eukaryota
- Kingdom: Animalia
- Phylum: Arthropoda
- Class: Insecta
- Order: Coleoptera
- Suborder: Polyphaga
- Infraorder: Scarabaeiformia
- Family: Scarabaeidae
- Genus: Onitis
- Species: O. humerosus

Binomial name
- Onitis humerosus (Pallas, 1771)

Synonyms
- Onitis chevrolati Lucas, 1849; Onitis cupripennis Balthasar, 1963; Onitis menalcas Pallas, 1781; Onitis violaceipennis Miksic, 1950; Onitis violaceus Sahlberg, 1913; Onitis viridipennis Miksic, 1950; Scarabaeus humerosus Pallas, 1771; Scarabaeus menalcas Pallas, 1781

= Onitis humerosus =

Species of beetle

Onitis humerosus is a species of Scarabaeidae or scarab beetles in the superfamily Scarabaeoidea.

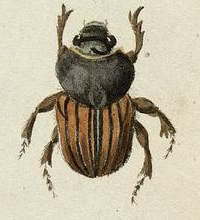
Illustration of Onitis humerosus

== Distribution ==
This species has a Palaearctic distribution (East Mediterranean, Caucasus, Southern East Ukraine, Turkestan, Afghanistan, Pakistan, Cyprus)
