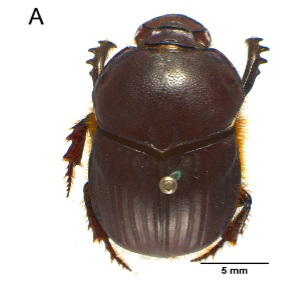

Scientific classification
- Kingdom: Animalia
- Phylum: Arthropoda
- Class: Insecta
- Order: Coleoptera
- Suborder: Polyphaga
- Infraorder: Scarabaeiformia
- Family: Scarabaeidae
- Genus: Onitis
- Species: O. feae

Binomial name
- Onitis feae Felsche, 1907

= Onitis feae =

Species of beetle

Onitis feae is a species of dung beetle in the family Scarabaeidae. It is fairly widespread in south Asia.

== Description ==
Black and subopaque, with the head, lower surface, and legs very dark red. Length is 15–20.5 mm, and breadth is 8.5–11.5 mm.

== Distribution ==
India (Arunachal Pradesh, Assam, Meghalaya, Mizoram), China, Laos, Myanmar, Thailand
