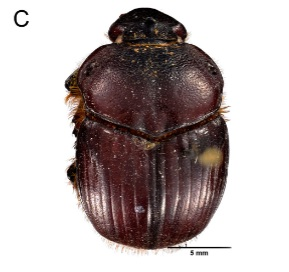

Scientific classification
- Kingdom: Animalia
- Phylum: Arthropoda
- Class: Insecta
- Order: Coleoptera
- Suborder: Polyphaga
- Infraorder: Scarabaeiformia
- Family: Scarabaeidae
- Genus: Onitis
- Species: O. castaneus

Binomial name
- Onitis castaneus Kollar, 1844

Synonyms
- Onitis castaneus Redtenbacher, 1844

= Onitis castaneus =

Species of beetle

Onitis castaneus is a species of dung beetle in the family Scarabaeidae. Description based on two specimen collected by Harold in Kashmir. It is widely distributed in South Asia.

== Description ==
Deep chestnut red color. Length is 16–19 mm, and breadth is 9.5–12 mm.

== Distribution ==
India (Arunachal Pradesh, Assam, Bihar, Gujarat, Haryana, Himachal Pradesh, Jammu and Kashmir, Madhya Pradesh, Meghalaya, Punjab, Rajasthan, Uttarakhand, Uttar Pradesh, West Bengal), Bangladesh, Nepal, Pakistan

== Habitat ==
Bamboo dominated secondary forest in Meghalaya, India.
