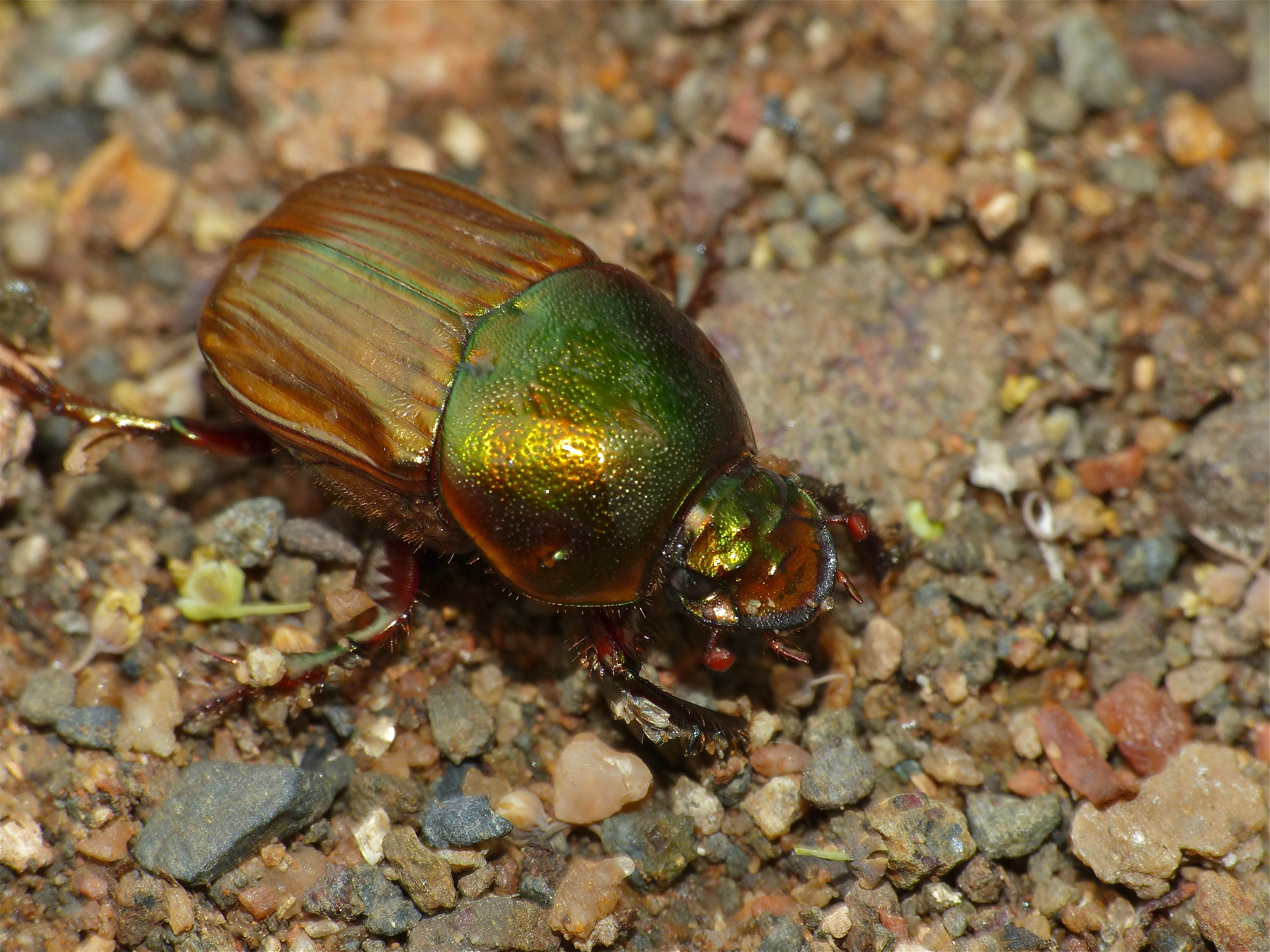

Scientific classification
- Domain: Eukaryota
- Kingdom: Animalia
- Phylum: Arthropoda
- Class: Insecta
- Order: Coleoptera
- Suborder: Polyphaga
- Infraorder: Scarabaeiformia
- Family: Scarabaeidae
- Genus: Onitis
- Species: O. alexis

Binomial name
- Onitis alexis Klug, 1835

= Onitis alexis =

Species of beetle

Onitis alexis, the bronze dung beetle, is a species of dung beetle in the family Scarabaeidae. It is endemic to Africa, Syria, Spain, Tunisia and Greece. It was introduced into Australia and is established in the warmer regions of northern Australia. The species is found in Oceania.

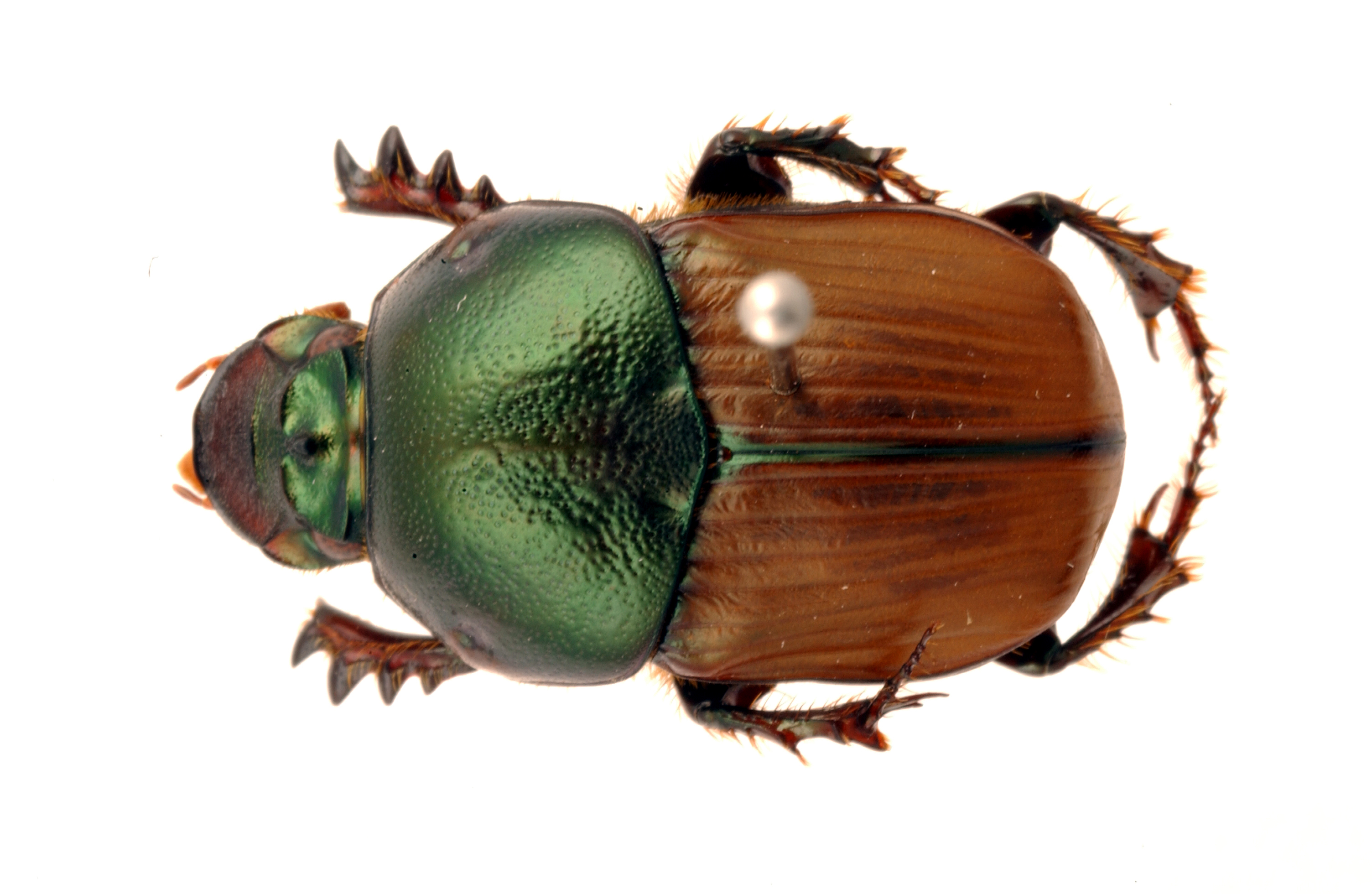
Bronze dung beetle, Onitis alexis

== Subspecies ==
These two subspecies belong to the species Onitis alexis:

- Onitis alexis alexis
- Onitis alexis septentrionalis Balthasar, 1942
