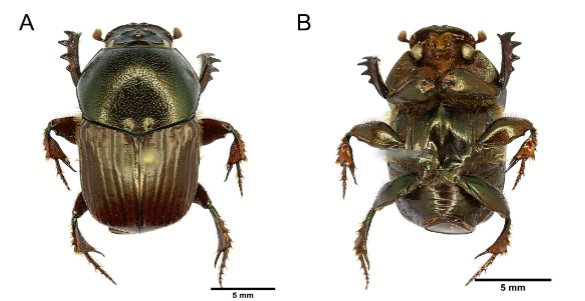

Scientific classification
- Kingdom: Animalia
- Phylum: Arthropoda
- Class: Insecta
- Order: Coleoptera
- Suborder: Polyphaga
- Infraorder: Scarabaeiformia
- Family: Scarabaeidae
- Genus: Onitis
- Species: O. kethai

Binomial name
- Onitis kethai Karimbumkara & Priyadarsanan, 2024

= Onitis kethai =

Species of beetle

Onitis kethai is a species of dung beetle in the family Scarabaeidae. It is only known from its type locality Biligiri Rangaswamy temple Tiger Reserve in Karnataka state of India.

Onitis kethai measures 11.5–15 mm in length and 6–7.5 mm in breadth.

The species was named in memory of the late field assistant Ketha Gowda, who helped the team in sampling beetles and other insects.
