= Citrobacter gillenii =

Scientific classification
- Domain: Bacteria
- Kingdom: Pseudomonadati
- Phylum: Pseudomonadota
- Class: Gammaproteobacteria
- Order: Enterobacterales
- Family: Enterobacteriaceae
- Genus: Citrobacter
- Species: C. gillenii

Binomial name
- Citrobacter gillenii Brenner et al. 1999

Species of bacterium

Citrobacter gillenii is a species of Gram-negative bacteria.
