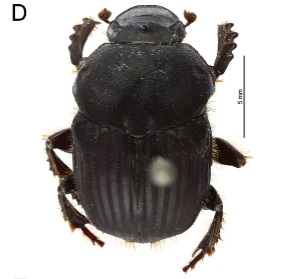

Scientific classification
- Kingdom: Animalia
- Phylum: Arthropoda
- Class: Insecta
- Order: Coleoptera
- Suborder: Polyphaga
- Infraorder: Scarabaeiformia
- Family: Scarabaeidae
- Genus: Onitis
- Species: O. crassus

Binomial name
- Onitis crassus Sharp, 1875

Synonyms
- Onitis vischnu Preudhomme de Borre, 1881

= Onitis crassus =

Species of beetle

Onitis crassus is a species of dung beetle in the family Scarabaeidae described by David Sharp based on a specimen collected in India.

== Description ==
Black, not very shining. Length is 15.5–21 mm, and breadth is 9–10.5 mm.

== Distribution ==
India (Madhya Pradesh, Punjab, Uttarakhand, Uttar Pradesh), Nepal, Pakistan

== Habitat ==
Found in cattle dung.
