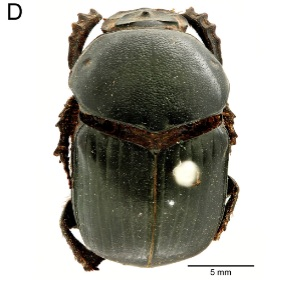

Scientific classification
- Kingdom: Animalia
- Phylum: Arthropoda
- Class: Insecta
- Order: Coleoptera
- Suborder: Polyphaga
- Infraorder: Scarabaeiformia
- Family: Scarabaeidae
- Genus: Onitis
- Species: O. virens

Binomial name
- Onitis virens Lansberge, 1875

Synonyms
- Onitis amplectens Lansberge, 1875

= Onitis virens =

Species of beetle

Onitis virens is a species of dung beetle in the family Scarabaeidae. It is fairly widespread in south Asia.

== Description ==
Black, with a very feeble metallic lustre, and moderately shining. Length is 18–23 mm, and breadth is 10–13 mm.

== Distribution ==
India (Arunachal Pradesh, Assam, Bihar, Chhattisgarh, Gujarat, Haryana, Himachal Pradesh, Karnataka, Kerala, Madhya Pradesh, Maharashtra, Meghalaya, Nagaland, New Delhi, Odisha, Punjab, Rajasthan, Sikkim, Tamil Nadu, Tripura, Uttarakhand, Uttar Pradesh, West Bengal), China, Bangladesh, Laos, Myanmar, Nepal, Pakistan, Thailand, Vietnam
