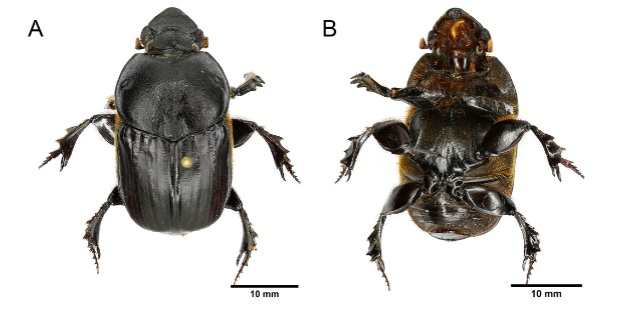

Scientific classification
- Kingdom: Animalia
- Phylum: Arthropoda
- Class: Insecta
- Order: Coleoptera
- Suborder: Polyphaga
- Infraorder: Scarabaeiformia
- Family: Scarabaeidae
- Genus: Onitis
- Species: O. bordati

Binomial name
- Onitis bordati Cambefort, 1988

= Onitis bordati =

Species of beetle

Onitis bordati, is a species of dung beetle in the family Scarabaeidae.

== Distribution ==
Vietnam (Annam), Thailand (Tak province), India (Meghalaya)

== Habitat ==
Bamboo dominated secondary forest in Meghalaya, India.
