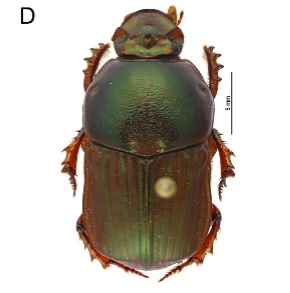

Scientific classification
- Kingdom: Animalia
- Phylum: Arthropoda
- Class: Insecta
- Order: Coleoptera
- Suborder: Polyphaga
- Infraorder: Scarabaeiformia
- Family: Scarabaeidae
- Genus: Onitis
- Species: O. naviauxi

Binomial name
- Onitis naviauxi Cambefort, 1988

= Onitis naviauxi =

Species of beetle

Onitis naviauxi is a species of beetle of the Scarabaeidae family. This species is found in Nepal.

== Description ==
Adults reach a length of about 20–25 mm (0.79–0.98 in). Their body is bronzy green and shining.
