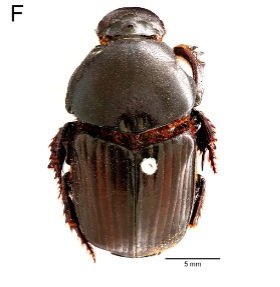

Scientific classification
- Kingdom: Animalia
- Phylum: Arthropoda
- Class: Insecta
- Order: Coleoptera
- Suborder: Polyphaga
- Infraorder: Scarabaeiformia
- Family: Scarabaeidae
- Genus: Onitis
- Species: O. punctatostriatus

Binomial name
- Onitis punctatostriatus Janssens, 1937

= Onitis punctatostriatus =

Species of beetle

Onitis punctatostriatus is a species of beetle of the family Scarabaeidae. This species is found in India (Arunachal Pradesh, Assam, Tripura, West Bengal) and Pakistan.

== Description ==
Adults reach a length of about 17.5–23 mm. Their body is black or reddish black and moderately shining.
