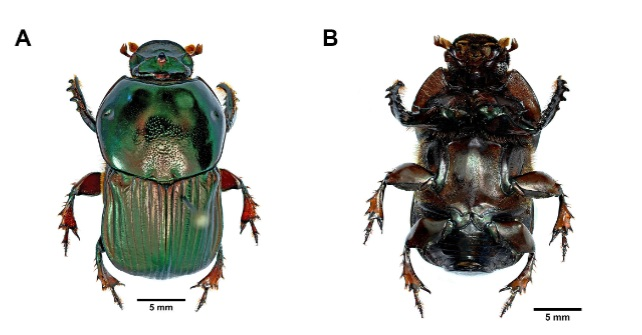
- Male
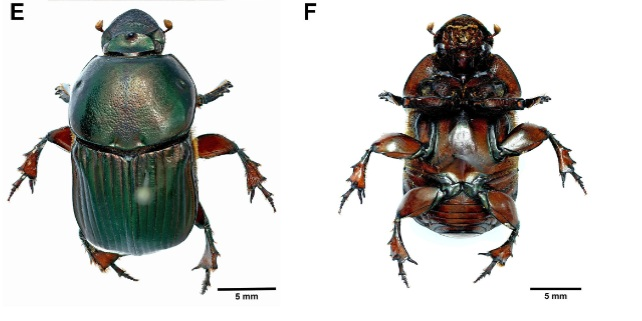
- Female

Scientific classification
- Kingdom: Animalia
- Phylum: Arthropoda
- Class: Insecta
- Order: Coleoptera
- Suborder: Polyphaga
- Infraorder: Scarabaeiformia
- Family: Scarabaeidae
- Genus: Onitis
- Species: O. assamensis

Binomial name
- Onitis assamensis Biswas, 1980

= Onitis assamensis =

Species of beetle

Onitis assamensis, is a species of dung beetle in the family Scarabaeidae. It is only known from its type locality Kaziranga National Park in Assam state of India. The specimen was first collected in Kaziranga by A. K. Ghosh in 1971 and described by S Biswas in 1979.

== Etymology ==
Named after the state Assam which is type locality where type specimen was collected.

== Habitat ==
Decaying Rhinoceros dung.
