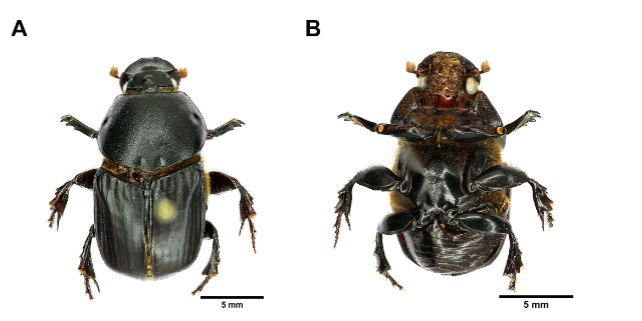

Scientific classification
- Kingdom: Animalia
- Phylum: Arthropoda
- Class: Insecta
- Order: Coleoptera
- Suborder: Polyphaga
- Infraorder: Scarabaeiformia
- Family: Scarabaeidae
- Genus: Onitis
- Species: O. bhomorensis

Binomial name
- Onitis bhomorensis Karimbumkara & Priyadarsanan, 2024

= Onitis bhomorensis =

Species of beetle

Onitis bhomorensis, is a species of dung beetle in the family Scarabaeidae. It is only known from its type locality near Tezpur in Assam state of India.

== Etymology ==
Named after the Kolia Bhomora Setu across Brahmaputra – the widest river in India, near which the type specimen was collected.

== Habitat ==
River bed of Brahmaputra which is dry seasonal grasslands with dominant species is Ziziphus jujuba trees.
