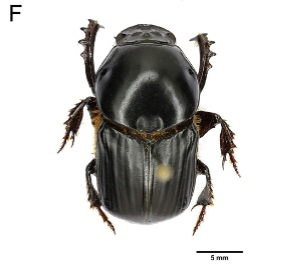

Scientific classification
- Kingdom: Animalia
- Phylum: Arthropoda
- Clade: Pancrustacea
- Class: Insecta
- Order: Coleoptera
- Suborder: Polyphaga
- Infraorder: Scarabaeiformia
- Family: Scarabaeidae
- Genus: Onitis
- Species: O. falcatus

Binomial name
- Onitis falcatus (Wulfen, 1786)

Synonyms
- Scarabaeus falcatus Wulfen, 1786; Onitis himaleyicus Redtenbacher, 1844; Onitis kiuchii Masumoto 1995

= Onitis falcatus =

Species of beetle

Onitis falcatus is a species of dung beetle in the family Scarabaeidae. It is fairly widespread in Asia.

== Description ==
Black or nearly black, with a clothing of reddish-yellow hair upon the legs and lower surface, smooth and shining, with the elytra and pygidium subopaque. Length is 16–23 mm, and breadth is 8–12 mm.

== Distribution ==
India (Andhra Pradesh, Arunachal Pradesh, Assam, Bihar, Gujarat, Haryana, Himachal Pradesh, Jharkhand, Karnataka, Kerala, Madhya Pradesh, Maharashtra, Manipur, Meghalaya, Mizoram, Nagaland, New Delhi, Odisha, Puducherry,Punjab, Rajasthan, Tamil Nadu, Tripura, Uttarakhand, Uttar Pradesh, West Bengal), Bangladesh, Bhutan, Cambodia, China, Laos, Myanmar, Malay Peninsula, Nepal, Pakistan, Philippines, Taiwan, Thailand, Vietnam
