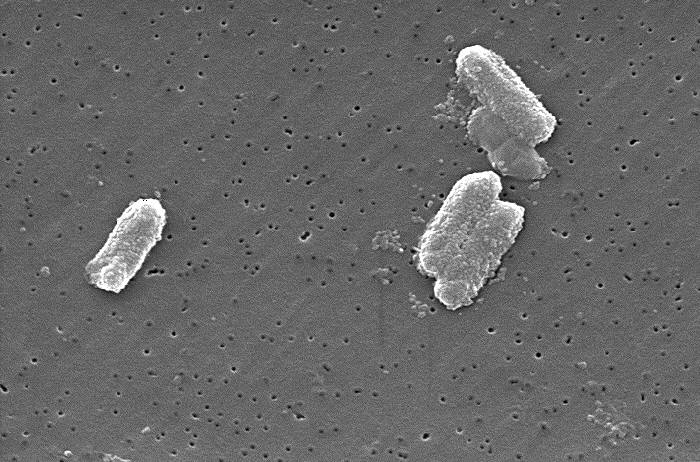
- Citrobacter freundii

Scientific classification
- Domain: Bacteria
- Kingdom: Pseudomonadati
- Phylum: Pseudomonadota
- Class: Gammaproteobacteria
- Order: Enterobacterales
- Family: Enterobacteriaceae
- Genus: Citrobacter; Werkman and Gillen, 1932

Species
- C. amalonaticus; C. braakii; C. europaeus; C. farmeri; C. freundii; C. gillenii; C. koseri; C. murliniae; C. pasteurii; C. portucalensis; C. rodentium; C. sedlakii; C. werkmanii; C. youngae

= Citrobacter =

Genus of bacteria

Citrobacter is a genus of Gram-negative, aerobic, rod-shaped coliform bacteria of the Enterobacteriaceae family.

Citrobacter spp. cause opportunistic infections (including urinary tract infections, gastroenteritis, and bacteremia).

== Microbiology ==
=== Microbial biochemistry ===
The species C. amalonaticus, C. koseri, and C. freundii can use citrate as a sole carbon source. Citrobacter species are differentiated by their ability to convert tryptophan to indole (C. koseri is the only Citrobacter species to be commonly indole-positive), ferment lactose (C. koseri is a lactose fermentor), and use malonate.

Citrobacter shows the ability to accumulate uranium by building phosphate complexes.

=== Environmental microbiology ===
These bacteria can be found almost everywhere in soil, water, wastewater, etc. They can also be found in the human intestine.

== Clinical significance ==
Citrobacter are found in the intestinal tract of humans and transmission usually occurs through human to human contact. They are considered opportunistic nosocomial pathogens, typically associated with urinary tract infections and infant meningitis and sepsis.

=== Antimicrobial resistance ===
Citrobacter freundii strains have inducible ampC genes encoding resistance to ampicillin and first-generation cephalosporins. In addition, isolates of Citrobacter may be resistant to many other antibiotics as a result of plasmid-encoded resistance genes.
