= DpnI =

Restriction enzyme

Type II Methyl-directed restriction enzyme DpnI

Identifiers
- Organism: Streptococcus pneumoniae
- Symbol: dpnC
- Orthologs: OMA: entry
- PDB: 4ESJ
- UniProt: P0A460

Other data
- EC number: 3.1.21.4
Search for
- Structures: Swiss-model
- Domains: InterPro

DpnI (pronounced "D-P-N one") is a Type IIM restriction endonuclease isolated from Streptococcus pneumoniae (formerly Diplococcus pneumonae). It recognizes and cuts methylated DNA at the sequence Gm6A↓TC.

== Structure ==
The structure of DpnI comprises an N-terminal catalytic domain and a C-terminal winged helix DNA binding domain, both of which show specificity for the methylated GATC sequence. The catalytic domain is disordered in solution and becomes ordered upon binding DNA.

== Uses in molecular biology ==
DpnI is commonly used to digest template DNA after site-directed mutagenesis. Most strains of E. coli used in molecular biology express Dam methylase, a protein that methylates DNA at the sequence GATC. Adding DpnI to the product of a PCR reaction digests only the template DNA, as the template DNA was isolated from E. coli and will have methylation at this sequence while the newly synthesized DNA will not. DpnI is widely available commercially, both alone and in "KLD" enzyme mixes containing kinase and ligase enzymes for treatment of site-directed mutagenesis reactions.

DpnI is also used to digest methylated GATC sequences in DamID, a technique that uses Dam methylation combined with sequencing to identify protein-DNA interactions.

== See also ==
- DpnII restriction endonuclease family, also isolated from S. pneumonae
- List of restriction enzyme cutting sites
- Restriction modification system
