= Citrobacter amalonaticus =

Scientific classification
- Domain: Bacteria
- Kingdom: Pseudomonadati
- Phylum: Pseudomonadota
- Class: Gammaproteobacteria
- Order: Enterobacterales
- Family: Enterobacteriaceae
- Genus: Citrobacter
- Species: C. amalonaticus

Binomial name
- Citrobacter amalonaticus (Young et al., 1971)

Species of bacterium

Citrobacter amalonaticus is a Gram-negative species of bacteria, a known human pathogen: it can cause neonatal meningitis and potentially gastroenteritis. It has been known to infect the urinary tract.
