= Propanediol =

Propanediol may refer to any of four isomeric organic chemical compounds:

== Non-geminal diols (glycols) ==
- 1,2-Propanediol (propylene glycol), a vicinal diol
- 1,3-Propanediol (trimethylene glycol)

== Geminal diols ==
- 1,1-Propanediol
- 2,2-Propanediol
