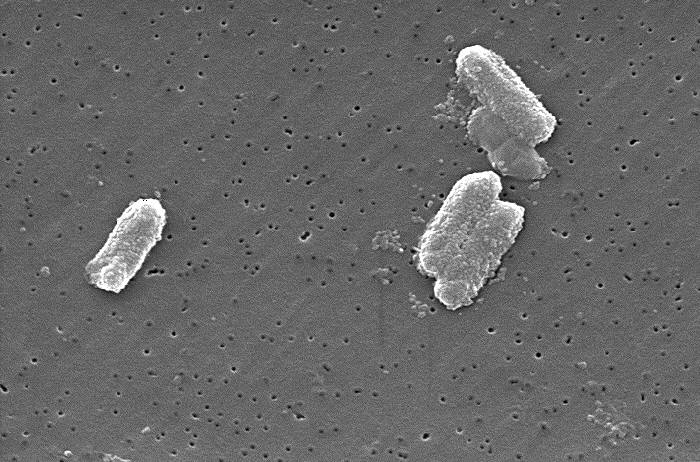
- Scanning electron micrograph of C. freundii
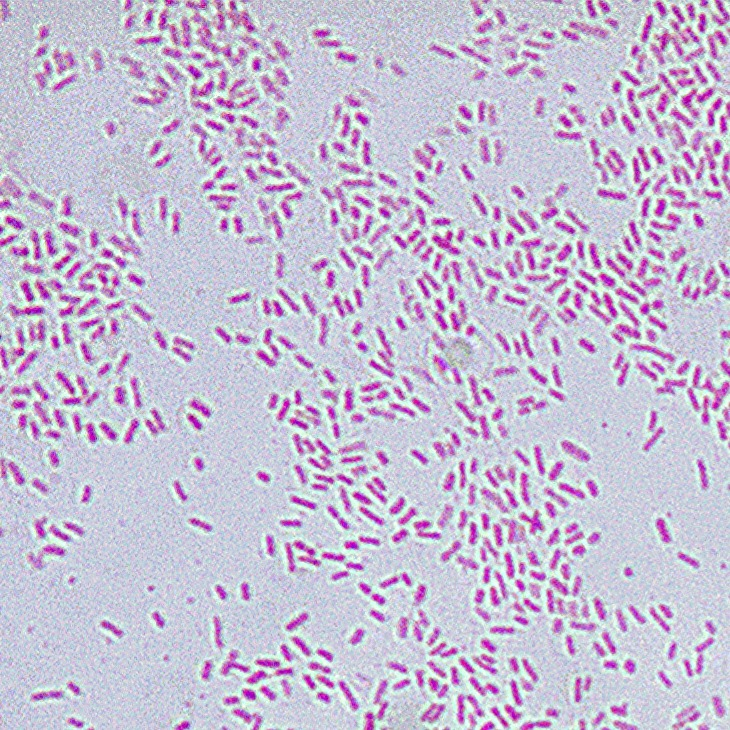
- C. freundii staining negative on Gram stain slide

Scientific classification
- Domain: Bacteria
- Kingdom: Pseudomonadati
- Phylum: Pseudomonadota
- Class: Gammaproteobacteria
- Order: Enterobacterales
- Family: Enterobacteriaceae
- Genus: Citrobacter
- Species: C. freundii

Binomial name
- Citrobacter freundii (Braak 1928) Werkman and Gillen 1932

= Citrobacter freundii =

Species of bacterium

Citrobacter freundii is a species of facultative anaerobic Gram-negative bacteria of the family Enterobacteriaceae which currently consists of 13 recognized species. These bacteria have a rod shape with a typical length of 1–5 μm. Most C. freundii cells have several flagella used for locomotion, although some non-motile taxa do not. C. freundii is a soil-dwelling microorganism, but can also be found in water, sewage, food, and the intestinal tracts of animals and humans. The genus Citrobacter was first described in 1932 by Werkman and Gillen. Cultures of C. freundii were isolated and identified in the same year from soil extracts and canal water. C. freundii was originally named Bacterium freundii by Braak in 1928 until Werkman and Gillen proposed the current name.

== Cell morphology and features ==
Exopolysaccharides from C. freundii target the hydroxyl radical, demonstrating antioxidant activity. These antioxidant properties are related to many different physical and chemical properties.

Citrobacter freundii has an aggressive adherence pattern that has been found in the cells of goats, which has been shown to play a role in its pathogenicity; although, this is not a guarantee of infection.

Biofilm formation plays a major role in the infection rates of C. freundii demonstrating different modes of infection that include not only adherence, but also biofilm formation at room temperature. Strong biofilm adherence can also lead to a reservoir for resistance in antimicrobial genes, meaning that even though adherence is not directly causing infection in these cases, adherence is creating resistance.

Large biofilms are formed at 25 °C by non-cytotoxic multidrug resistant strains of C. freundii which form as a result of adherence in an aggregative pattern to colon epithelial cells. Through using transmission electron microscopy, it was found that strains which are aggregative do not have any fimbriae that are visible on the surface. Expression of the fimbriae to form biofilms can be regulated by temperature, similar to those in some Enterobacteriales. Biofilm formation rates have been shown to be relatively low, but after growth at room temperature, more C. freundii strains are shown to create strong biofilms which aid in the persistence of this strain in hospital-like environments. This suggests that these strains use a strategy different from others to succeed when it comes to the disease's success and persistence in the host. This demonstrates that the formation of biofilms can be influenced very strongly by differing temperatures.

=== Relation to cancer ===
Citrobacter freundii along with other members of Enterobacterales (as well as members of Pseudomonadales) has been noted as bacteria that can be found naturally inside tumors. Further, this intratumor microbiota has been associated with metabolically driven chemotherapeutic resistance of certain cancers. Specifically, C. freundii has been found in the microbiota of pancreatic cancers, and it has been determined that it can drive chemotherapeutic resistance to 5-Fluorouracil via metabolic enzyme activity, thus rendering the chemotherapeutic agent inactive as metabolic by-products. The enzyme responsible for this, preTA, is a bacterial equivalent of the human enzyme Dihydropyrimidine dehydrogenase (DPD), which can be inhibited by drugs such as Gimeracil.

Conversely, C. freundii can also have a positive impact when it comes to the treatment of some cancers; specifically, it has been found to be helpful in killing and treating cervical carcinoma. Certain isolated strains of C. freundii have toxicity against HeLa cells, which is an immortal human cell line originating from cervical cancer cells.

== Phylogeny and genome evolution ==
Citrobacter freundii is more phylogenetically diverse than the clades of E. coli and Salmonella spp., indicating C. freundii to be a polyphyletic genus. Due to the phenotypic diversity that C. freundii contains, it makes it very difficult to identify, especially because it is versatile not only in its antigenic and pathogenic behaviors, but also in its cell morphology.

Citrobacter freundii contains high degrees of nucleotide diversity due to the two different lineages with deep separation within the taxon. Based on phylogenetic information these lineage divisions correlate perfectly with information about geography and host species demonstrating that these factors have importance regarding selectivity. When it comes to each gene, species can differ among various taxa, and divergent branches on some trees can appear to be closely related on other trees. Despite this division in lineage, all strains of C. freundii utilize citrate.

Further evidence of evolution can be drawn from two classes of beta-lactamase from C. freundii: CMY-2 AmpC beta-lactamase and TEM-1 beta-lactamase. Neither of these have resistance to beta-lactam and they do not pass on any alleles with resistance that occur naturally. In vitro evolution shows that there is potential for resistance evolution in relation to cefepime for both CMY-2 and TEM-1. The resistance that is gained by CMY-2 and TEM-1 is to Gram-negative bacteria. Unevolved CMY-2 demonstrates more resistance than TEM-1 does (four times the amount); however, TEM-1 produced higher levels of resistance than that of CMY-2 when both evolved.

== Metabolic details ==
Citrobacter freundii has the ability to grow on glycerol, and use it as its sole source of carbon and energy. The organism contains a bacterial microcompartment capable of processing propanediol. C. freundii creates a positive MR and negative VP test along with a positive catalase and negative oxidase test. C. freundii cannot hydrolyze starch, lipids, or gelatin. C. freundii has also been investigated for biodegradation of tannic acid used in tanneries.

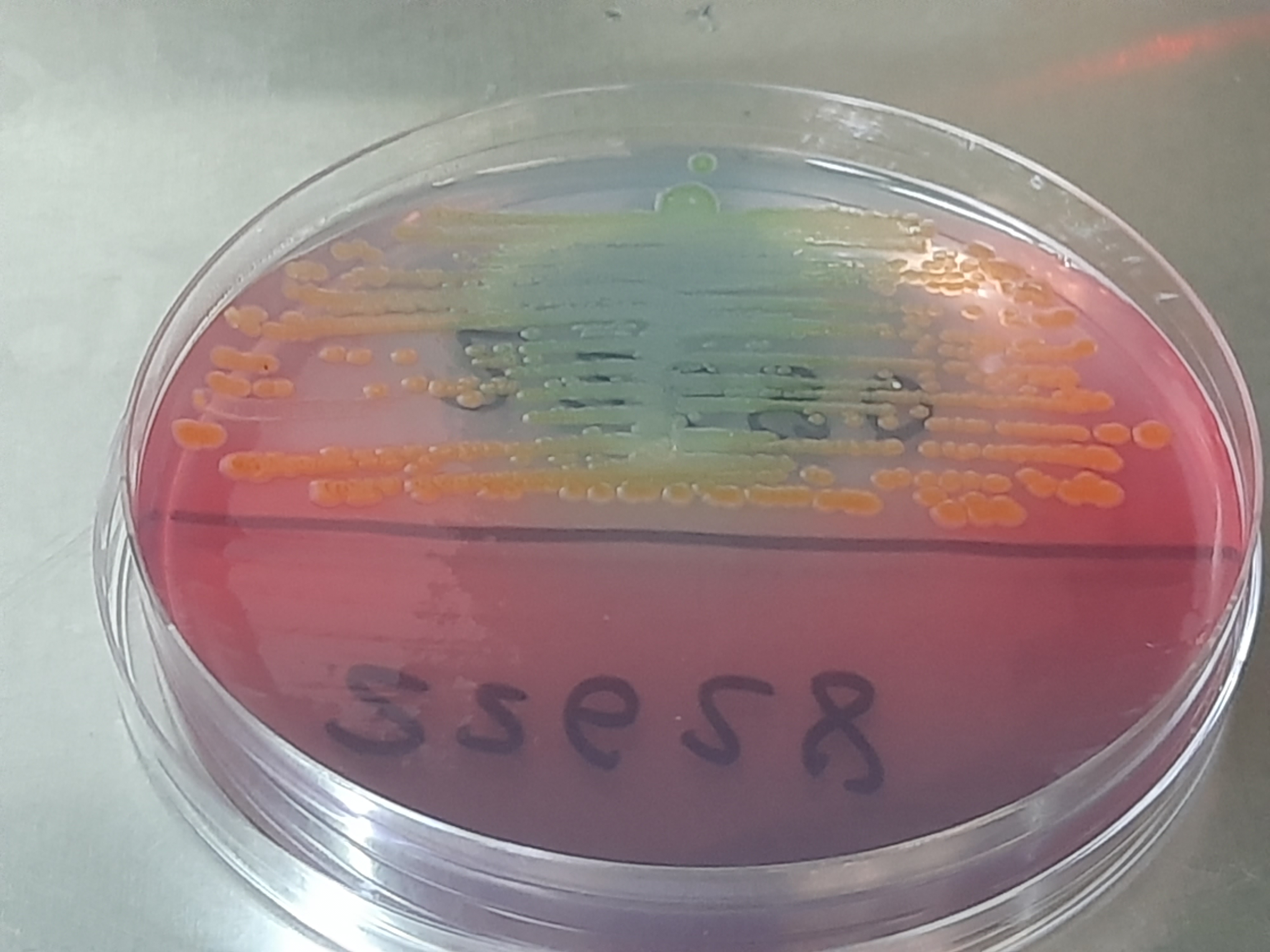
C. freundii colony morphology on CLED agar of urine culture after 24 hours of incubation. Citrobacter freundii is a lactose fermenter, and this is reflected in the colony color on CLED agar. The fermentation of lactose produces acid, leading to the change in color.

In laboratory culture, C. freundii produces smooth, moist colonies on general media. On differential media such as MacConkey agar, most strains ferment lactose, forming pink to red colonies due to acid production interacting with the neutral red indicator, although some isolates may ferment lactose slowly or be late fermenters. These traits aid in differentiating C. freundii from non-lactose fermenters in the Enterobacteriaceae.

Citrobacter freundii includes a fenvalerate-degrading bacterial strain, CD-9. Fenvalerate degradation through CD-9 also includes degradation of intermediate products. This ultimately prevents a buildup of intermediates at the end of an experiment which shows that this strain may completely metabolize esters and incorporate a complete metabolic pathway for fenvalerate degradation. Optimal conditions for CD-9 include: fenvalerate concentration of 77 mg/L, pH of 6.3, and inoculation amount of 6% (v/v). These conditions favor 88% fenvalerate degradation in 72 hours. The enzyme that causes degradation of fenvalerate was found to be an intracellular enzyme.

Unique fitness genes show that numerous metabolic pathways, namely tat-dependent protein secretion, DNA recombination, and repair processes, are all essential for C. freundii's survival in the circulation system. These findings point to either the need to identify the principal host carbon source or the ability of C. freundii to adjust for the loss of individual carbon consumption pathways in the host environment. The tatC mutant of C. freundii showed about half the reduction in swimming motility compared to the wild-type strain, and swimming motility was completely restored by the trans gene complementarity. These results highlight motility deficiencies in the absence of tatC function. However, since swimming is rarely observed in the tatC mutant, it is possible that flagellar function is retained to some extent.

== Relevance to broader system ==
Citrobacter freundii is also commonly found to be a member of the soil microbiome. This microbe plays an important role in the nitrogen cycle in the environment. C. freundii is also a nitrogen-fixing bacteria, a process demonstrated in the living tissues of sassafras trees. This process provides evidence that they are partly responsible for reducing nitrate to nitrite in the environment.

Citrobacter freundii can also be found in the intestinal tracts of humans and other animals from diverse environmental sources. C. freundii is a common component of the gut microbiome of healthy humans. While most strains are beneficial, there are significant phenotypic variations among strains, even those that share >99% of their genome. C. freundii interactions with healthy people are normally regarded as non-pathogenic; nevertheless, once in the bloodstream, C. freundii can cause a life-threatening infection that can progress into sepsis. As a result, C. freundii belongs to a limited group of Gram-negative bacterial species that are frequently encountered in healthcare settings and can cause a variety of illnesses in people with a variety of underlying disorders.

Toxigenic C. freundii appears to be rare, and its main influence on human health is as an opportunistic pathogen. As such, C. freundii causes a wide range of illnesses, including infections of the urinary system, respiratory tract, wounds, circulation, and other sites in immunocompromised patients. According to North American healthcare facilities, the Citrobacter genus is responsible for 3–6% of Enterobacteriaceae infections and is one of the most frequent strains associated with human infection.

Virulence genes that are identical or homologous to those identified in E. coli pathotypes as well as in Salmonella, have also been identified in C. freundii. Phenotypic changes that are reversible from the parental strain of atypical C. freundii have been identified as a result of a fluctuating environment. A possible explanation for this is the hypothesis that the offspring from a bacterial strain will be produced with varying degrees of phenotypic changes in order to increase the rates of survival in challenging conditions. It has been found that in natural bacterial populations, genomic changes can and do occur, but many of these changes become deleterious, causing survival to occur only in small portions of the population under the conditions of natural selection pressure.
