= DpnII restriction endonuclease family =

DpnII

Identifiers
- Symbol: DpnII
- Pfam: PF04556
- Pfam clan: CL0236
- InterPro: IPR007637
Available protein structures:
- PDB: IPR007637 PF04556 (ECOD; PDBsum)
- AlphaFold: IPR007637; PF04556

In molecular biology, the DpnII restriction endonuclease family is a family of restriction endonucleases which includes DpnII from Diplococcus pneumoniae. These enzymes recognise the double-stranded DNA unmethylated sequence GATC and cleave before G-1, where it encompasses the full length of the protein.
