= List of restriction enzyme cutting sites: Bsa–Bso =

Legend of nucleobases
Code	Nucleotide represented
A	Adenine (A)
C	Cytosine (C)
G	Guanine (G)
T	Thymine (T)
N	A, C, G or T
M	A or C
R	A or G
W	A or T
Y	C or T
S	C or G
K	G or T
H	A, C or T
B	C, G or T
V	A, C or G
D	A, G or T

This article contains a list of the most studied restriction enzymes whose names start with Bsa to Bso inclusive. It contains approximately 90 enzymes. The following information is given:

- Enzyme: Accepted name of the molecule, according to the internationally adopted nomenclature, and bibliographical references. (Further reading: see the section "Nomenclature" in the article "Restriction enzyme".)
- PDB code: Code used to identify the structure of a protein in the PDB database of protein structures. The 3D atomic structure of a protein provides highly valuable information to understand the intimate details of its mechanism of action.
- Source: Organism that naturally produces the enzyme.
- Recognition sequence: Sequence of DNA recognized by the enzyme and to which it specifically binds.
- Cut: Cutting site and DNA products of the cut. The recognition sequence and the cutting site usually match, but sometimes the cutting site can be dozens of nucleotides away from the recognition site.
- Isoschizomers and neoschizomers: An isoschizomer is an enzyme that recognizes the same sequence as another. A neoschizomer is a special type of isoschizomer that recognizes the same sequence as another, but cuts in a different manner. A maximum number of 8-10 most common isoschizomers are indicated for every enzyme but there may be many more. Neoschizomers are shown in bold and green color font (e.g.: **BamHI**). When "None on date" is indicated, that means that there were no registered isoschizomers in the databases on that date with a clearly defined cutting site. Isoschizomers indicated in white font and grey background correspond to enzymes not listed in the current lists:

as in this not listed enzyme:	EcoR70I

== Restriction enzymes ==
=== Bsa - Bso ===
**Enzyme**	**PDB code**	Source	**Recognition sequence**	**Cut**	**Isoschizomers**
BsaI		Bacillus stearothermophilus 20241	5' GGTCTC; 3' CCAGAG	5' ---GGTCTCN NNNN--- 3'; 3' ---CCAGAGNNNNN --- 5'	Bso31I, BspTNI, Eco31I
Bsa29I		Bacillus sp. 29	5' ATCGAT; 3' TAGCTA	5' ---AT CGAT--- 3'; 3' ---TAGC TA--- 5'	AagI, BanIII, BavCI, BseCI, BspDI, Bsu15I, BsuTUI, ClaI, BbvAII
BsaAI		Bacillus stearothermophilus G668	5' YACGTR; 3' RTGCAY	5' ---YAC GTR--- 3'; 3' ---RTG CAY--- 5'
BsaBI		Bacillus stearothermophilus B674	5' GATN_{4}ATC; 3' CTAN_{4}TAG	5' ---GATNN NNATC--- 3'; 3' ---CTANN NNTAG--- 5'
BsaHI		Bacillus stearothermophilus CPW11	5' GRCGYC; 3' CYGCRG	5' ---GR CGYC--- 3'; 3' ---CYGC RG--- 5'	AcyI, AhaII, AosII, AstWI, AsuIII, BbiII, BstACI, HgiI, PamII
BsaJI		Bacillus stearothermophilus J695	5' CCNNGG; 3' GGNNCC	5' ---C CNNGG--- 3'; 3' ---GGNNC C--- 5'
BsaMI		Bacillus stearothermophilus M293	5' GAATGC; 3' CTTACG	5' ---GAATGCN --- 3'; 3' ---CTTAC GN--- 5'	Asp26HI, Asp35HI, Asp36HI, Asp50HI, BsaMI, BsmI, Mva1269I
BsaOI		Bacillus stearothermophilus O-122	5' CGRYCG; 3' GCYRGC	5' ---CGRY CG--- 3'; 3' ---GC YRGC--- 5'
BsaWI		Bacillus stearothermophilus W1718	5' WCCGGW; 3' WGGCCW	5' ---W CCGGW--- 3'; 3' ---WGGCC W--- 5'
BsaXI		Bacillus stearothermophilus 25B	5' ACN_{5}CTCC; 3' TGN_{5}GAGG	5' ---ACN_{5}CTCCN_{6}NNNN --- 3'; 3' ---TGN_{5}GAGGN_{6}N NNN--- 5'	BsmCI, BsmDI, BsmXI
BscI		Bacillus sp.	5' ATCGAT; 3' TAGCTA	5' ---AT CGAT--- 3'; 3' ---TAGC TA--- 5'	BanIII, BavCI, Bci29I, BdiI, Bli41I, BliAI, LplI, PgaI, SpmI
Bsc4I		Bacillus schlegelii 4	5' CCN_{7}GG; 3' GGN_{7}CC	5' ---CCNNNNN NNGG--- 3'; 3' ---GGNN NNNNNCC--- 5'
Bsc91I		Bacillus sp.	5' GAAGAC; 3' CTTCTG	5' ---GAAGACNN NNNN--- 3'; 3' ---CTTCTGNNNNNN --- 5'
Bsc107I		Bacillus schlegelii 107	5' CCN_{7}GG; 3' GGN_{7}CC	5' ---CCNNNNN NNGG--- 3'; 3' ---GGNN NNNNNCC--- 5'
BscAI		Bacillus schlegelii S3	5' GCATC; 3' CGTAG	5' ---GCATCNNNN NN--- 3'; 3' ---CGTAGNNNNNN --- 5'
BscBI		Bacillus sp. A11	5' GGNNCC; 3' CCNNGG	5' ---GGN NCC--- 3'; 3' ---CCN NGG--- 5'	AspNI, / BmiI, / BspLI, NlaIV, PspN4I
BscCI		Bacillus sp. 2G	5' GAATGC; 3' CTTACG	5' ---GAATGCN --- 3'; 3' ---CTTAC GN--- 5'	Asp26HI, Asp27HI, Asp35HI, Asp36HI, BsaMI, BscCI, PctI
BscFI		Bacillus sp. JY391	5' GATC; 3' CTAG	5' --- GATC--- 3'; 3' ---CTAG --- 5'	Bfi57I, Bsp143I, BspJI, BtkII, CviAI, Kzo9I, NlaII, SsiBI
Bse1I		Bacillus stearothermophilus 1	5' ACTGG; 3' TGACC	5' ---ACTGGN --- 3'; 3' ---TGAC CN--- 5'
Bse8I		Bacillus sp. 8	5' GATN_{4}ATC; 3' CTAN_{4}TAG	5' ---GATNN NNATC--- 3'; 3' ---CTANN NNTAG--- 5'
Bse15I		Bacillus sp. 15	5' CYCGRG; 3' GRGCYC	5' ---C YCGRG--- 3'; 3' ---GRGCY C--- 5'	Ama87I, AvaI, BcoI, BsoBI, BstSI, Eco88I, NspSAI, OfoI
Bse16I		Bacillus sp. 16	5' CCWGG; 3' GGWCC	5' ---CC WGG--- 3'; 3' ---GGW CC--- 5'	AeuI, BseBI, BsiLI, BstNI, BstM6I, BthDI, BthEI, **EcoRII**, MvaI
Bse17I		Bacillus sp. 17	5' CCWGG; 3' GGWCC	5' ---CC WGG--- 3'; 3' ---GGW CC--- 5'	AeuI, BseBI, Bse16I, Bst2I, BstNI, Bst38I, Bst100I, **Psp6I**, **PspGI**
Bse21I		Bacillus sp. 21	5' CCTNAGG; 3' GGANTCC	5' ---CC TNAGG--- 3'; 3' ---GGANT CC--- 5'	AxyI, BliHKI, BspR7I, Bsu36I, Eco81I, MstII, OxaNI, SshAI
Bse24I		Bacillus sp. 24	5' CCWGG; 3' GGWCC	5' ---CC WGG--- 3'; 3' ---GGW CC--- 5'	AeuI, BseBI, Bse16I, Bst2I, BstNI, Bst38I, Bst100I, **Psp6I**, **PspGI**
Bse64I		Bacillus sp. 64	5' GGTNACC; 3' CCANTGG	5' ---G GTNACC--- 3'; 3' ---CCANTG G--- 5'	AspAI, Bse64I, BseT9I, BstPI, EcaI, Eci125I, EcoO65I, NspSAII
Bse118I		Bacillus sp. 118	5' RCCGGY; 3' YGGCCR	5' ---R CCGGY--- 3'; 3' ---YGGCC R--- 5'
Bse634I	1KNV	Bacillus sp. 634	5' RCCGGY; 3' YGGCCR	5' ---R CCGGY--- 3'; 3' ---YGGCC R--- 5'
BseAI		Bacillus sphaericus	5' TCCGGA; 3' AGGCCT	5' ---T CCGGA--- 3'; 3' ---AGGCC T--- 5'	AccIII, Aor13HI, BlfI, BsiMI, Bsp13I, BspMII, CauB3I, Kpn2I
BseBI		Bacillus stearothermophilus	5' CCWGG; 3' GGWCC	5' ---CC WGG--- 3'; 3' ---GGW CC--- 5'	**AjnI**, AorI, Bse17I, Bst1I, BstOI, Bst2UI, **EcoRII**, MvaI, **SleI**, ZanI
BseCI		Bacillus sp.	5' ATCGAT; 3' TAGCTA	5' ---AT CGAT--- 3'; 3' ---TAGC TA--- 5'	AagI, BanIII, BavCI, Bsa29I, BspDI, Bsu15I, BsuTUI, ClaI, LcaI
BseDI		Bacillus stearothermophilus RFL1434	5' CCNNGG; 3' GGNNCC	5' ---C CNNGG--- 3'; 3' ---GGNNC C--- 5'
Bse3DI		Bacillus stearothermophilus 3D	5' GCAATG; 3' CGTTAC	5' ---GCAATGNN --- 3'; 3' ---CGTTAC NN--- 5'
BseGI		Bacillus stearothermophilus Vs 34-031	5' GGATG; 3' CCTAC	5' ---GGATGNN --- 3'; 3' ---CCTAC NN--- 5'
BseJI		Bacillus stearothermophilus Tsp5	5' GATN_{4}ATC; 3' CTAN_{4}TAG	5' ---GATNN NNATC--- 3'; 3' ---CTANN NNTAG--- 5'
BseKI		Bacillus stearothermophilus Ra3-212	5' GCAGC; 3' CGTCG	5' ---GCAGCN_{7}N NNNN--- 3'; 3' ---CGTCGN_{7}NNNNN --- 5'	AlwXI, BbvI, BseXI, Bsp423I, Bst12I, Bst71I, BstV1I
BseLI		Bacillus stearothermophilus LK3-551	5' CCN_{7}GG; 3' GGN_{7}CC	5' ---CCNNNNN NNGG--- 3'; 3' ---GGNN NNNNNCC--- 5'
BseMI		Bacillus stearothermophilus Isl 15-111	5' GCAATG; 3' CGTTAC	5' ---GCAATGNN --- 3'; 3' ---CGTTAC NN--- 5'
BseMII		Bacillus stearothermophilus Isl 15-111	5' CTCAG; 3' GAGTC	5' ---CTCAGN_{7}NNN --- 3'; 3' ---GAGTCN_{7}N NN--- 5'
BseNI		Bacillus sp. N	5' ACTGG; 3' TGACC	5' ---ACTGGN --- 3'; 3' ---TGAC CN--- 5'
BsePI		Bacillus stearothermophilus P6	5' GCGCGC; 3' CGCGCG	5' ---G CGCGC--- 3'; 3' ---CGCGC G--- 5'
BseQI		Bacillus sp. Q	5' GGCC; 3' CCGG	5' ---GG CC--- 3'; 3' ---CC GG--- 5'
BseRI		Bacillus sp. R	5' GAGGAG; 3' CTCCTC	5' ---GAGGAGN_{7}NNN --- 3'; 3' ---CTCCTCN_{7}N NN--- 5'
BseSI		Bacillus stearothermophilus Jo-553	5' GKGCMC; 3' CMCGKG	5' ---GKGCM C--- 3'; 3' ---C MCGKG--- 5'
BseT9I		Bacillus sp. T9	5' GGTNACC; 3' CCANTGG	5' ---G GTNACC--- 3'; 3' ---CCANTG G--- 5'	AcrII, Bse64I, BstEII, BstT9I, EcaI, Eci125I, EcoO65I, NspSAII, PspEI
BseT10I		Bacillus sp. T10	5' GGTNACC; 3' CCANTGG	5' ---G GTNACC--- 3'; 3' ---CCANTG G--- 5'	AcrII, AspAI, BstEII, BstT10I, BstPI, EcoO128I, EcoO65I, PspEI
BseXI		Bacillus stearothermophilus Ra3-212	5' GCAGC; 3' CGTCG	5' ---GCAGCN_{7}N NNNN--- 3'; 3' ---CGTCGN_{7}NNNNN --- 5'	AlwXI, BbvI, BseKI, Bsp423I, Bst12I, Bst71I, BstV1I
BseX3I		Bacillus stearothermophilus X3	5' CGGCCG; 3' GCCGGC	5' ---C GGCCG--- 3'; 3' ---GCCGG C--- 5'	AaaI, BstZI, EagI, EclXI, Eco52I, SenPT16I, XmaIII
BseYI		Bacillus sp. 2521	5' CCCAGC; 3' GGGTCG	5' ---C CCAGC--- 3'; 3' ---GGGTC G--- 5'
BseZI		Bacillus sp. Z	5' CTCTTC; 3' GAGAAG	5' ---CTCTTCN NNN--- 3'; 3' ---GAGAAGNNNN --- 5'
BsgI		Bacillus sphaericus B922	5' GTGCAG; 3' CACGTC	5' ---GTGCAGN_{12}NNNN --- 3'; 3' ---CACGTCN_{12}NN NN--- 5'
BshI		Bacillus sphaericus	5' GGCC; 3' CCGG	5' ---GG CC--- 3'; 3' ---CC GG--- 5'
Bsh45I		Bacillus sphaericus 45	5' GWGCWC; 3' CWCGWG	5' ---GWGCW C--- 3'; 3' ---C WCGWG--- 5'	Alw21I, AspHI, Bbv12I, BsiHKAI, HgiAI, / HpyF46II, / MspV281I
Bsh1236I		Bacillus sphaericus RFL1236	5' CGCG; 3' GCGC	5' ---CG CG--- 3'; 3' ---GC GC--- 5'	AccII, BceBI, BspFNI, Bsp50I, Csp68KVI, FauBII, MvnI, **SelI**
Bsh1285I		Bacillus sphaericus RFL1285	5' CGRYCG; 3' GCYRGC	5' ---CGRY CG--- 3'; 3' ---GC YRGC--- 5'
Bsh1365I		Bacillus sphaericus RFL1365	5' GATN_{4}ATC; 3' CTAN_{4}TAG	5' ---GATNN NNATC--- 3'; 3' ---CTANN NNTAG--- 5'
BshFI		Bacillus sphaericus	5' GGCC; 3' CCGG	5' ---GG CC--- 3'; 3' ---CC GG--- 5'
BshGI		Bacillus sphaericus	5' CCWGG; 3' GGWCC	5' ---CC WGG--- 3'; 3' ---GGW CC--- 5'	AeuI, BseBI, Bse16I, Bst2I, BstNI, Bst38I, Bst100I, **PspGI**, **SspAI**
BshKI		Bacillus sphaericus	5' GGNCC; 3' CCNGG	5' ---G GNCC--- 3'; 3' ---CCNG G--- 5'	AspS9I, Bac36I, BavAII, Bsp1894I, BspBII, CcuI, MaeK81II, Pde12I
BshNI		Bacillus sphaericus TK-45	5' GGYRCC; 3' CCRYGG	5' ---G GYRCC--- 3'; 3' ---CCRYG G--- 5'	BanI, BbvBI, BspT107I, Eco64I, HgiCI, HgiHI, MspB4I, PfaAI
BshTI		Bacillus sphaericus Jo22-024	5' ACCGGT; 3' TGGCCA	5' ---A CCGGT--- 3'; 3' ---TGGCC A--- 5'	AgeI, AsiAI, / AsiGI, / CsiAI; CspAI, PinAI
BsiI		Bacillus sphaericus	5' CACGAG; 3' GTGCTC	5' ---C ACGAG--- 3'; 3' ---GTGCT C--- 5'
BsiBI		Bacillus sp.	5' GATN_{4}ATC; 3' CTAN_{4}TAG	5' ---GATNN NNATC--- 3'; 3' ---CTANN NNTAG--- 5'
BsiCI		Bacillus sp.	5' TTCGAA; 3' AAGCTT	5' ---TT CGAA--- 3'; 3' ---AAGC TT--- 5'	AcpI, AsuII, Bpu14I, BspT104I, Csp45I, FspII, NspV, PpaAI, SfuI
BsiEI		Bacillus sp.	5' CGRYCG; 3' GCYRGC	5' ---CGRY CG--- 3'; 3' ---GC YRGC--- 5'
BsiHKAI		Bacillus stearothermophilus	5' GWGCWC; 3' CWCGWG	5' ---GWGCW C--- 3'; 3' ---C WCGWG--- 5'	Alw21I, AspHI, Bbv12I, Bsh45I, Bsm6I, / HgiAI, MspV281I
BsiHKCI		Bacillus sp. HKC	5' CYCGRG; 3' GRGCYC	5' ---C YCGRG--- 3'; 3' ---GRGCY C--- 5'	AquI, BcoI, Bse15I, BspLU4I, Eco88I, **Nli3877I**, PlaAI, PunAI
BsiKI		Bacillus sp.	5' GGTNACC; 3' CCANTGG	5' ---G GTNACC--- 3'; 3' ---CCANTG G--- 5'
BsiLI		Bacillus sp.	5' CCWGG; 3' GGWCC	5' ---CC WGG--- 3'; 3' ---GGW CC--- 5'	AglI, BseBI, Bse17I, Bst2I, BstNI, Bst38I, Bst100I, **EcoRII**, MvaI
BsiMI		Bacillus sp.	5' TCCGGA; 3' AGGCCT	5' ---T CCGGA--- 3'; 3' ---AGGCC T--- 5'	AccIII, BbvAIII, BlfI, Bsp13I, BspMII, Bsu23I, Kpn2I, PinBII
BsiQI		Bacillus sp.	5' TGATCA; 3' ACTAGT	5' ---T GATCA--- 3'; 3' ---ACTAG T--- 5'	AbaI, BclI, BspXII, BstT7I, FbaI, Ksp22I, / ParI
BsiSI		Bacillus sp.	5' CCGG; 3' GGCC	5' ---C CGG--- 3'; 3' ---GGC C--- 5'
BsiWI		Bacillus sp.	5' CGTACG; 3' GCATGC	5' ---C GTACG--- 3'; 3' ---GCATG C--- 5'
BsiXI		Bacillus sp. X	5' ATCGAT; 3' TAGCTA	5' ---AT CGAT--- 3'; 3' ---TAGC TA--- 5'	BscI, BsiXI, Bsp106I, BspDI, Bsu15I, BsuTUI, ClaI, Rme21I
BsiYI		Bacillus sp.	5' CCN_{7}GG; 3' GGN_{7}CC	5' ---CCNNNNN NNGG--- 3'; 3' ---GGNN NNNNNCC--- 5'
BsiZI		Bacillus sp.	5' GGNCC; 3' CCNGG	5' ---G GNCC--- 3'; 3' ---CCNG G--- 5'	AspS9I, Bac36I, BavAII, BshKI, BspBII, CcuI, MaeK81II, Pde12I
BslI		Bacillus sp.	5' CCN_{7}GG; 3' GGN_{7}CC	5' ---CCNNNNN NNGG--- 3'; 3' ---GGNN NNNNNCC--- 5'
BslFI		Bacillus stearothermophilus FI	5' GGGAC; 3' CCCTG	5' ---GGGACN_{8}NN NNNN--- 3'; 3' ---CCCTGN_{8}NNNNNN --- 5'
BsmI		Bacillus stearothermophilus NUB	5' GAATGC; 3' CTTACG	5' ---GAATGCN --- 3'; 3' ---CTTAC GN--- 5'	Asp26HI, Asp36HI, Asp40HI, BmaHI, BscCI, Mva1269I, PctI
BsmAI		Bacillus stearothermophilus A664	5' GTCTC; 3' CAGAG	5' ---GTCTCN NNNN--- 3'; 3' ---CAGAGNNNNN --- 5'	Alw26I, / BcoDI, BscQII, / BsoMAI, BstMAI
BsmBI		Bacillus stearothermophilus B61	5' CGTCTC; 3' GCAGAG	5' ---CGTCTCN NNNN--- 3'; 3' ---GCAGAGNNNNN --- 5'
BsmFI		Bacillus stearothermophilus F	5' GGGAC; 3' CCCTG	5' ---GGGACN_{8}NN NNNN--- 3'; 3' ---CCCTGN_{8}NNNNNN --- 5'
BsmSI		Bacillus stearothermophilus CP114	5' CCWWGG; 3' GGWWCC	5' ---C CWWGG--- 3'; 3' ---GGWWC C--- 5'
Bso31I		Bacillus stearothermophilus E31	5' GGTCTC; 3' CCAGAG	5' ---GGTCTCN NNNN--- 3'; 3' ---CCAGAGNNNNN --- 5'
BsoBI	1DC1	Bacillus stearothermophilus JN2091	5' CYCGRG; 3' GRGCYC	5' ---C YCGRG--- 3'; 3' ---GRGCY C--- 5'	AquI, BcoI, BsiHKCI, BspLU4I, Eco88I, **Nli3877I**, PlaAI, PunAI
BsoCI		Bacillus stearothermophilus AU891	5' GDGCHC; 3' CHCGDG	5' ---GDGCH C--- 3'; 3' ---C HCGDG--- 5'	AocII, BmyI, Bsp1286I, BspLS2I, MhlI, NspII, SduI
BsoFI		Bacillus stearothermophilus F66	5' GCNGC; 3' CGNCG	5' ---GC NGC--- 3'; 3' ---CGN CG--- 5'
BsoMAI		Bacillus stearothermophilus MA	5' GTCTC; 3' CAGAG	5' ---GTCTCN NNNN--- 3'; 3' ---CAGAGNNNNN --- 5'	Alw26I, / BcoDI, BscQII, / BsmAI, BstMAI
