= List of restriction enzyme cutting sites: Bd–Bp =

Legend of nucleobases
Code	Nucleotide represented
A	Adenine (A)
C	Cytosine (C)
G	Guanine (G)
T	Thymine (T)
N	A, C, G or T
M	A or C
R	A or G
W	A or T
Y	C or T
S	C or G
K	G or T
H	A, C or T
B	C, G or T
V	A, C or G
D	A, G or T

This article contains a list of the most studied restriction enzymes whose names start with Bd to Bp inclusive. It contains approximately 100 enzymes.

The following information is given:

- Enzyme: Accepted name of the molecule, according to the internationally adopted nomenclature, and bibliographical references. (Further reading: see the section "Nomenclature" in the article "Restriction enzyme".)
- PDB code: Code used to identify the structure of a protein in the PDB database of protein structures. The 3D atomic structure of a protein provides highly valuable information to understand the intimate details of its mechanism of action.
- Source: Organism that naturally produces the enzyme.
- Recognition sequence: Sequence of DNA recognized by the enzyme and to which it specifically binds.
- Cut: Cutting site and DNA products of the cut. The recognition sequence and the cutting site usually match, but sometimes the cutting site can be dozens of nucleotides away from the recognition site.
- Isoschizomers and neoschizomers: An isoschizomer is an enzyme that recognizes the same sequence as another. A neoschizomer is a special type of isoschizomer that recognizes the same sequence as another, but cuts in a different manner. A maximum number of 8-10 most common isoschizomers are indicated for every enzyme but there may be many more. Neoschizomers are shown in bold and green color font (e.g.: **BamHI**). When "None on date" is indicated, that means that there were no registered isoschizomers in the databases on that date with a clearly defined cutting site. Isoschizomers indicated in white font and grey background correspond to enzymes not listed in the current lists:

as in this not listed enzyme:	EcoR70I

== Restriction enzymes ==
=== Bd - Bp ===
**Enzyme**	**PDB code**	Source	**Recognition sequence**	**Cut**	**Isoschizomers**
BdiI		Brevibacterium divaricatum	5' ATCGAT; 3' TAGCTA	5' ---AT CGAT--- 3'; 3' ---TAGC TA--- 5'	BavCI, Bci29I, Bli41I, Bli86I, BseCI, BsuTUI, Rme21I, SpmI
BdiSI		Bacteroides distasonis	5' CTRYAG; 3' GAYRTC	5' ---C TRYAG--- 3'; 3' ---GAYRT C--- 5'
BecAII		Brevibacterium sp. A	5' GGCC; 3' CCGG	5' ---GG CC--- 3'; 3' ---CC GG--- 5'
BepI		Brevibacterium epidermidis	5' CGCG; 3' GCGC	5' ---CG CG--- 3'; 3' ---GC GC--- 5'	AccII, BepI, BspFNI, BstUI, Bsu1532I, BtkI, FalII, FauBII, ThaI
BetI		Brevibacterium acetyliticum	5' WCCGGW; 3' WGGCCW	5' ---W CCGGW--- 3'; 3' ---WGGCC W--- 5'
BfaI		Bacteroides fragilis	5' CTAG; 3' GATC	5' ---C TAG--- 3'; 3' ---GAT C--- 5'
BfiI	2C1L	Bacillus firmus S8120	5' ACTGGG; 3' TGACCC	5' ---ACTGGGNNNNN --- 3'; 3' ---TGACCCNNNN N--- 5'	BmrI
Bfi57I		Butyrivibrio fibrisolvens OB157	5' GATC; 3' CTAG	5' --- GATC--- 3'; 3' ---CTAG --- 5'	Bsp105I, Bsp143I, BspJI, BstMBI, CviAI, Kzo9I, NdeII, SsiBI
Bfi89I		Butyrivibrio fibrisolvens OB189	5' YGGCCR; 3' RCCGGY	5' ---Y GGCCR--- 3'; 3' ---RCCGG Y--- 5'
BflI		Bacillus flavothermus	5' CCN_{7}GG; 3' GGN_{7}CC	5' ---CCNNNNN NNGG--- 3'; 3' ---GGNN NNNNNCC--- 5'
BfmI		Bacillus firmus S8-336	5' CTRYAG; 3' GAYRTC	5' ---C TRYAG--- 3'; 3' ---GAYRT C--- 5'
BfrI		Bacteroides fragilis	5' CTTAAG; 3' GAATTC	5' ---C TTAAG--- 3'; 3' ---GAATT C--- 5'
BfrBI		Bacteroides fragilis BE3	5' ATGCAT; 3' TACGTA	5' ---ATGCA T--- 3'; 3' ---T ACGTA--- 5'	Csp68KIII, EcoT22I, Mph1103I, PinBI, Ppu10I, SepI, SspD5II, Zsp2I
BfuI		Bacillus firmus Auk 22-m21	5' GTATCC; 3' CATAGG	5' ---GTATCCN_{4}NN --- 3'; 3' ---CATAGGN_{4}N N--- 5'	BciVI
BfuAI		Bacillus fusiformis	5' ACCTGC; 3' TGGACG	5' ---ACCTGCNNNN NNNN--- 3'; 3' ---TGGACGNNNNNNNN --- 5'	Acc36I, BspMI, BveI
BfuCI		Bacillus fusiformis 1226	5' GATC; 3' CTAG	5' --- GATC--- 3'; 3' ---CTAG --- 5'	Bce243I, Bsp105I, BspFI, **BstKTI**, CpfI, HacI, MkrAI, Sth368I
BglI	1DMU	Bacillus globigii	5' GCCN_{5}GGC; 3' CGGN_{5}CCG	5' ---GCCNNNN NGGC--- 3'; 3' ---CGGN NNNNCCG--- 5'
BglII	1ES8	Bacillus globigii	5' AGATCT; 3' TCTAGA	5' ---A GATCT--- 3'; 3' ---TCTAG A--- 5'
BimI		Brevibacterium immotum	5' TTCGAA; 3' AAGCTT	5' ---TT CGAA--- 3'; 3' ---AAGC TT--- 5'	AcpI, AsuII, Bpu14I, BspT104I, CbiI, FspII, MlaI, PpaAI, SfuI
Bim19I		Brevibacterium immotum 19	5' TTCGAA; 3' AAGCTT	5' ---TT CGAA--- 3'; 3' ---AAGC TT--- 5'	AcpI, AsuII, Bpu14I, BspT104I, CbiI, FspII, MlaI, PpaAI, SfuI
Bim19II		Brevibacterium immotum 19	5' GGCC; 3' CCGG	5' ---GG CC--- 3'; 3' ---CC GG--- 5'
BinI		Bifidobacterium infantis 659	5' GGATC; 3' CCTAG	5' ---GGATCNNNN N--- 3'; 3' ---CCTAGNNNNN --- 5'	AclWI, AlwI, / BsrWI, / BspPI, BstH9I, / Bth617I, / EacI
BlfI		Bacillus licheniformis	5' TCCGGA; 3' AGGCCT	5' ---T CCGGA--- 3'; 3' ---AGGCC T--- 5'	AccIII, Aor13HI, BseAI, BsiMI, BspMII, Bsu23I, Kpn2I, PinBII
Bli41I		Bacillus licheniformis 41	5' ATCGAT; 3' TAGCTA	5' ---AT CGAT--- 3'; 3' ---TAGC TA--- 5'	Bci29I, Bli86I, BseCI, BsiXI, BsuTUI, Rme21I, SpmI, Ssp27144I
Bli86I		Bacillus licheniformis 86	5' ATCGAT; 3' TAGCTA	5' ---AT CGAT--- 3'; 3' ---TAGC TA--- 5'	BliAI, Bli41I, BseDI, BsiXI, Rme21I, SpmI, Ssp27144I, ZhoI
Bli736I		Bacillus licheniformis 736	5' GGTCTC; 3' CCAGAG	5' ---GGTCTCN NNNN--- 3'; 3' ---CCAGAGNNNNN --- 5'
BliAI		Bacillus licheniformis	5' ATCGAT; 3' TAGCTA	5' ---AT CGAT--- 3'; 3' ---TAGC TA--- 5'	BliRI, Bli41I, BsiXI, BspDI, Rme21I, SpmI, Ssp27144I, ZhoI
BliHKI		Bacillus licheniformis HK	5' CCTNAGG; 3' GGANTCC	5' ---CC TNAGG--- 3'; 3' ---GGANT CC--- 5'	AocI, AxyI, Bse21I, Bsu36I, Eco81I, MstII, SauI, SshAI
BliRI		Bacillus licheniformis	5' ATCGAT; 3' TAGCTA	5' ---AT CGAT--- 3'; 3' ---TAGC TA--- 5'	BciBI, BdiI, Bli41I, BsiXI, BspDI, BspXI, LplI, SpmI, ZhoI
BlnI		Brevibacterium linens	5' CCTAGG; 3' GGATCC	5' ---C CTAGG--- 3'; 3' ---GGATC C--- 5'	AspA2I, AvrII, AvrBII, BspA2I, XmaJI
BloHI		Bifidobacterium longum E194b	5' RGATCY; 3' YCTAGR	5' ---R GATCY--- 3'; 3' ---YCTAG R--- 5'
BloHII		Bifidobacterium longum E194b	5' CTGCAG; 3' GACGTC	5' ---CTGCA G--- 3'; 3' ---G ACGTC--- 5'	AjoI, Asp713I, BsuBI, CflI, CfuII, HalII, PstI, SalPI, SflI, Sst12I
BlpI		Bacillus lentus	5' GCTNAGC; 3' CGANTCG	5' ---GC TNAGC--- 3'; 3' ---CGANT CG--- 5'
BluI		Brevibacterium luteum	5' CTCGAG; 3' GAGCTC	5' ---C TCGAG--- 3'; 3' ---GAGCT C--- 5'	AbrI, BssHI, BstVI, PanI, Sau3239I, Sfr274I, TliI, XhoI
Bme12I		Bacillus megaterium 12	5' GATC; 3' CTAG	5' --- GATC--- 3'; 3' ---CTAG --- 5'	Bfi57I, Bsp143I, BspJI, BstMBI, CviAI, Kzo9I, NlaII, SsiBI
Bme18I		Bacillus megaterium 18	5' GGWCC; 3' CCWGG	5' ---G GWCC--- 3'; 3' ---CCWG G--- 5'	BamNxI, BcuAI, Csp68KI, EagMI, FssI, HgiCII, HgiJI, SinI
Bme142I		Bacillus megaterium 142	5' RGCGCY; 3' YCGCGR	5' ---RGC GCY--- 3'; 3' ---YCG CGR--- 5'	**AccB2I**, / **BfoI**, / **Bsp143II**, **BstH2I**, **HaeII**, LpnI
Bme216I		Bacillus megaterium 216	5' GGWCC; 3' CCWGG	5' ---G GWCC--- 3'; 3' ---CCWG G--- 5'	BamNxI, BcuAI, Csp68KI, Eco47I, FssI, HgiCII, HgiJI, SinI
Bme361I		Bacillus megaterium 361	5' GGCC; 3' CCGG	5' ---GG CC--- 3'; 3' ---CC GG--- 5'
Bme585I		Bacillus mesentericus 585	5' CCCGC; 3' GGGCG	5' ---CCCGCNNNN NN--- 3'; 3' ---GGGCGNNNNNN --- 5'
Bme1390I		Bacillus megaterium RFL1390	5' CCNGG; 3' GGNCC	5' ---CC NGG--- 3'; 3' ---GGN CC--- 5'
Bme1580I		Bacillus megaterium 1580	5' GKGCMC; 3' CMCGKG	5' ---GKGCM C--- 3'; 3' ---C MCGKG--- 5'
BmgBI		Bacillus megaterium	5' CACGTC; 3' GTGCAG	5' ---CAC GTC--- 3'; 3' ---GTG CAG--- 5'
BmrI		Bacillus megaterium	5' ACTGGG; 3' TGACCC	5' ---ACTGGGNNNNN --- 3'; 3' ---TGACCCNNNN N--- 5'	BfiI
BmtI		Bacillus megaterium S2	5' GCTAGC; 3' CGATCG	5' ---GCTAG C--- 3'; 3' ---C GATCG--- 5'	AceII, **AsuNHI**, / BspOI, / **NheI**, **LlaG2I**, **PstNHI**
BmyI		Bacillus mycoides	5' GDGCHC; 3' CHCGDG	5' ---GDGCH C--- 3'; 3' ---C HCGDG--- 5'	AocII, BsoCI, Bsp1286I, BspLS2I, MhlI, NspII, SduI
BnaI		Bacillus natto B3364	5' GGATCC; 3' CCTAGG	5' ---G GATCC--- 3'; 3' ---CCTAG G--- 5'	AccEBI, BamHI, Bce751I, BstI, CelI, OkrAI, Nsp29132II, Pfl8I, SolI
BoxI		Brevibacterium oxydans Iti 12-025	5' GACN_{4}GTC; 3' CTGN_{4}CAG	5' ---GACNN NNGTC--- 3'; 3' ---CTGNN NNCAG--- 5'
BpcI		Bacillus sphaericus	5' CTRYAG; 3' GAYRTC	5' ---C TRYAG--- 3'; 3' ---GAYRT C--- 5'
BpiI		Bacillus pumilus sw 4-3	5' GAAGAC; 3' CTTCTG	5' ---GAAGACNN NNNN--- 3'; 3' ---CTTCTGNNNNNN --- 5'
BplI		Bacillus pumilus	5' GAGN_{5}CTC; 3' CTCN_{5}GAG	5' ---GAGN_{5}CTCN_{7}NNNNNN --- 3'; 3' ---CTCN_{5}GAGN_{7}N NNNNN--- 5'
BpmI		Bacillus pumilus	5' CTGGAG; 3' GACCTC	5' ---CTGGAGN_{13}NNN --- 3'; 3' ---GACCTCN_{13}N NN--- 5'
BpoAI		Bacillus polymyxa	5' ATTAAT; 3' TAATTA	5' ---AT TAAT--- 3'; 3' ---TAAT TA--- 5'	AseI, AsnI, PshBI, Sru4DI, VspI
BptI		Bacillus pantothenticus	5' CCWGG; 3' GGWCC	5' ---CC WGG--- 3'; 3' ---GGW CC--- 5'	**AjnI**, BseBI, Bse16I, BstNI, BstOI, BstM6I, Bst2UI, **EcoRII**, MvaI
BpuI		Bacillus pumilus AHU1387A	5' GRGCYC; 3' CYCGRG	5' ---GRGCY C--- 3'; 3' ---C YCGRG--- 5'
Bpu10I		Bacillus pumilus 10	5' CCTNAGC; 3' GGANTCG	5' ---CC TNAGC--- 3'; 3' ---GGANT CG--- 5'
Bpu14I		Bacillus pumilus 14	5' TTCGAA; 3' AAGCTT	5' ---TT CGAA--- 3'; 3' ---AAGC TT--- 5'	AcpI, AsuII, BsiCI, BspT104I, CbiI, FspII, MlaI, PpaAI, SfuI
Bpu95I		Bacillus pumilus 95	5' CGCG; 3' GCGC	5' ---CG CG--- 3'; 3' ---GC GC--- 5'	AccII, BepI, BspFNI, BstUI, Bsu1532I, FalII, FnuDII, MvnI, ThaI
Bpu1102I		Bacillus pumilus RFL1102	5' GCTNAGC; 3' CGANTCG	5' ---GC TNAGC--- 3'; 3' ---CGANT CG--- 5'
BpuAI		Bacillus pumilus	5' GAAGAC; 3' CTTCTG	5' ---GAAGACNN NNNN--- 3'; 3' ---CTTCTGNNNNNN --- 5'
BpuAmI		Bacillus pumilus	5' GAGCTC; 3' CTCGAG	5' ---GAG CTC--- 3'; 3' ---CTC GAG--- 5'
BpuB5I		Bacillus pumilus	5' CGTACG; 3' GCATGC	5' ---C GTACG--- 3'; 3' ---GCATG C--- 5'
BpuDI		Bacillus pumilus 1117	5' CCTNAGC; 3' GGANTCG	5' ---CC TNAGC--- 3'; 3' ---GGANT CG--- 5'
BpuEI		Bacillus pumilus 2187a	5' CTTGAG; 3' GAACTC	5' ---CTTGAGN_{13}NNN --- 3'; 3' ---GAACTCN_{13}N NN--- 5'
BpuJI	2VLA	Bacillus pumilus RFL1458	5' CCCGT; 3' GGGCA	5' ---CCCGTN_{10}N NNNNNNNN--- 3'; 3' ---GGGCAN_{10}NNNNNNNNN --- 5'	— None in May 2010 —
BpuSI		Bacillus pumilus	5' GGGAC; 3' CCCTG	5' ---GGGACN_{9}N NNNN--- 3'; 3' ---CCCTGN_{9}NNNNN --- 5'
