= List of restriction enzyme cutting sites: Bsp–Bss =

Legend of nucleobases
Code	Nucleotide represented
A	Adenine (A)
C	Cytosine (C)
G	Guanine (G)
T	Thymine (T)
N	A, C, G or T
M	A or C
R	A or G
W	A or T
Y	C or T
S	C or G
K	G or T
H	A, C or T
B	C, G or T
V	A, C or G
D	A, G or T

This article contains a list of the most studied restriction enzymes whose names start with Bsp to Bss inclusive. It contains approximately 180 enzymes.

The following information is given:

- Enzyme: Accepted name of the molecule, according to the internationally adopted nomenclature, and bibliographical references. (Further reading: see the section "Nomenclature" in the article "Restriction enzyme".)
- PDB code: Code used to identify the structure of a protein in the PDB database of protein structures. The 3D atomic structure of a protein provides highly valuable information to understand the intimate details of its mechanism of action.
- Source: Organism that naturally produces the enzyme.
- Recognition sequence: Sequence of DNA recognized by the enzyme and to which it specifically binds.
- Cut: Cutting site and DNA products of the cut. The recognition sequence and the cutting site usually match, but sometimes the cutting site can be dozens of nucleotides away from the recognition site.
- Isoschizomers and neoschizomers: An isoschizomer is an enzyme that recognizes the same sequence as another. A neoschizomer is a special type of isoschizomer that recognizes the same sequence as another, but cuts in a different manner. A maximum number of 8-10 most common isoschizomers are indicated for every enzyme but there may be many more. Neoschizomers are shown in bold and green color font (e.g.: **BamHI**). When "None on date" is indicated, that means that there were no registered isoschizomers in the databases on that date with a clearly defined cutting site. Isoschizomers indicated in white font and grey background correspond to enzymes not listed in the current lists:

as in this not listed enzyme:	EcoR70I

== Restriction enzymes ==
=== Bsp ===
**Enzyme**	**PDB code**	Source	**Recognition sequence**	**Cut**	**Isoschizomers**
Bsp6I		Bacillus sp. RFL6	5' GCNGC; 3' CGNCG	5' ---GC NGC--- 3'; 3' ---CGN CG--- 5'
Bsp13I		Bacillus sp. 13	5' TCCGGA; 3' AGGCCT	5' ---T CCGGA--- 3'; 3' ---AGGCC T--- 5'	AccIII, BbvAIII, BlfI, BsiMI, BspMII, Bsu23I, Kpn2I, PinBII
Bsp19I		Bacillus sp. 19	5' CCATGG; 3' GGTACC	5' ---C CATGG--- 3'; 3' ---GGTAC C--- 5'
Bsp24I		Bacillus sp. 24	5' GACN_{6}TGG; 3' CTGN_{6}ACC	5' ---GACN_{6}TGGN_{6}NNNNNN --- 3'; 3' ---CTGN_{6}ACCN_{6}N NNNNN--- 5'
Bsp50I		Bacillus sp. RFL50	5' CGCG; 3' GCGC	5' ---CG CG--- 3'; 3' ---GC GC--- 5'	BceBI, Bsh1236I, BstFNI, BstUI, Bsu1532I, FalII, FnuDII, MvnI, ThaI
Bsp63I		Bacillus sphaericus 63	5' CTGCAG; 3' GACGTC	5' ---CTGCA G--- 3'; 3' ---G ACGTC--- 5'	AjoI, Asp713I, BloHII, MhaAI, Pfl21I, PstI, SalPI, SflI, Sst12I, YenI
Bsp67I		Bacillus sphaericus 67	5' GATC; 3' CTAG	5' --- GATC--- 3'; 3' ---CTAG --- 5'	AspMDI, Bsp143I, BspJI, BtkII, DpnII, LlaAI, NlaII, SsiBI
Bsp68I		Bacillus sp. RFL68	5' TCGCGA; 3' AGCGCT	5' ---TCG CGA--- 3'; 3' ---AGC GCT--- 5'	NruI
Bsp98I		Bacillus sp. RFL98	5' GGATCC; 3' CCTAGG	5' ---G GATCC--- 3'; 3' ---CCTAG G--- 5'	AccEBI, AliI, BamHI, BnaI, BstI, CelI, OkrAI, NspSAIV, Pfl8I, SurI
Bsp105I		Bacillus sphaericus 105	5' GATC; 3' CTAG	5' --- GATC--- 3'; 3' ---CTAG --- 5'	Bfi57I, Bsp143I, BspJI, BtkII, DpnII, LlaAI, NlaII, SsiBI
Bsp106I		Bacillus sphaericus 106	5' ATCGAT; 3' TAGCTA	5' ---AT CGAT--- 3'; 3' ---TAGC TA--- 5'	BbvAII, Bci29I, BciBI, BcmI, BspOVII, BstNZ169I, Rme21I
Bsp119I		Bacillus sp. RFL119	5' TTCGAA; 3' AAGCTT	5' ---TT CGAA--- 3'; 3' ---AAGC TT--- 5'	AcpI, Bim19I, Bpu14I, BspT104I, Csp45I, FspII, NspV, SspRFI
Bsp120I		Bacillus sp. RFL120	5' GGGCCC; 3' CCCGGG	5' ---G GGCCC--- 3'; 3' ---CCCGG G--- 5'	**ApaI**, **PpeI**, PspOMI
Bsp123I		Bacillus sp. 123	5' CGCG; 3' GCGC	5' ---CG CG--- 3'; 3' ---GC GC--- 5'	BceBI, Bsh1236I, BstFNI, BstUI, BtkI, Csp68KVI, FnuDII, MvnI, ThaI
Bsp143I		Bacillus sp. RFL143	5' GATC; 3' CTAG	5' --- GATC--- 3'; 3' ---CTAG --- 5'	Bce243I, Bsp105I, BspFI, **BstKTI**, CpfI, HacI, NdeII, Sth368I, Sau3AI
Bsp143II		Bacillus sp. RFL143	5' RGCGCY; 3' YCGCGR	5' ---RGCGC Y--- 3'; 3' ---Y CGCGR--- 5'	AccB2I, / BfoI, / **Bme142I**, BstH2I, HaeII, **LpnI**
Bsp211I		Bacillus sphaericus 211	5' GGCC; 3' CCGG	5' ---GG CC--- 3'; 3' ---CC GG--- 5'
Bsp423I		Bacillus sp. 423	5' GCAGC; 3' CGTCG	5' ---GCAGCN_{7}N NNNN--- 3'; 3' ---CGTCGN_{7}NNNNN --- 5'	AlwXI, BbvI, BseKI, BseXI, Bst12I, Bst71I, BstV1I
Bsp519I		Bacillus sp. 519	5' GRGCYC; 3' CYCGRG	5' ---GRGCY C--- 3'; 3' ---C YCGRG--- 5'
Bsp1286I		Bacillus sphaericus	5' GDGCHC; 3' CHCGDG	5' ---GDGCH C--- 3'; 3' ---C HCGDG--- 5'	AocII, BmyI, BsoCI, Bsp1286I, BspLS2I, NspII, SduI
Bsp1407I		Bacillus stearothermophilus RFL1407	5' TGTACA; 3' ACATGT	5' ---T GTACA--- 3'; 3' ---ACATG T--- 5'	AauI, / BsmRI, / BsrGI, BstAUI, Ssp4800I, SspBI
Bsp1720I		Bacillus sp. 1720	5' GCTNAGC; 3' CGANTCG	5' ---GC TNAGC--- 3'; 3' ---CGANT CG--- 5'
Bsp1894I		Bacillus sphaericus 1894	5' GGNCC; 3' CCNGG	5' ---G GNCC--- 3'; 3' ---CCNG G--- 5'	AspS9I, Bac36I, BavBII, BshKI, BspBII, CcuI, MaeK81II, Pde12I
Bsp2095I		Bacillus sphaericus 2095	5' GATC; 3' CTAG	5' --- GATC--- 3'; 3' ---CTAG --- 5'	Bfi57I, Bsp143I, **BspKT6I**, BtkII, DpnII, LlaAI, NlaII, SsiBI
Bsp4009I		Bacillus sp. 4009	5' GGATCC; 3' CCTAGG	5' ---G GATCC--- 3'; 3' ---CCTAG G--- 5'	AccEBI, AliI, ApaCI, BamHI, BstI, CelI, OkrAI, Pfl8I, RspLKII, SurI
BspAI		Bacillus sphaericus JL4B	5' GATC; 3' CTAG	5' --- GATC--- 3'; 3' ---CTAG --- 5'	Bfi57I, Bsp2095I, **BspKT6I**, BtkII, DpnII, LlaAI, NlaII, SsiBI
BspA2I		Bacillus sp. A2	5' CCTAGG; 3' GGATCC	5' ---C CTAGG--- 3'; 3' ---GGATC C--- 5'	AspA2I, AvrII, AvrBII, BlnI, XmaJI
Bsp153AI		Bacillus sp. 153A	5' CAGCTG; 3' GTCGAC	5' ---CAG CTG--- 3'; 3' ---GTC GAC--- 5'
BspAAI		Bacillus sp. AA	5' CTCGAG; 3' GAGCTC	5' ---C TCGAG--- 3'; 3' ---GAGCT C--- 5'	AbrI, BluI, BstVI, PanI, SauLPII, **SciI**, SlaI, StrI, TliI
BspAAII		Bacillus sp. AA	5' TCTAGA; 3' AGATCT	5' ---T CTAGA--- 3'; 3' ---AGATC T--- 5'
BspAAIII		Bacillus sp. AA	5' GGATCC; 3' CCTAGG	5' ---G GATCC--- 3'; 3' ---CCTAG G--- 5'	AccEBI, AliI, ApaCI, AsiI, BamHI, Bce751I, Pfl8I, RspLKII, SolI
BspANI		Bacillus sp. AN	5' GGCC; 3' CCGG	5' ---GG CC--- 3'; 3' ---CC GG--- 5'
BspBI		Bacillus sphaericus JL14	5' CTGCAG; 3' GACGTC	5' ---CTGCA G--- 3'; 3' ---G ACGTC--- 5'	AjoI, ApiI, Asp713I, BloHII, CfrA4I, Pfl21I, PstI, SalPI, Sst12I, YenI
BspBII		Bacillus sphaericus JL14	5' GGNCC; 3' CCNGG	5' ---G GNCC--- 3'; 3' ---CCNG G--- 5'	AsuI, Bac36I, BavBII, BshKI, BspF4I, CcuI, MaeK81II, PspPI
BspBRI		Bacillus sp.	5' GGCC; 3' CCGG	5' ---GG CC--- 3'; 3' ---CC GG--- 5'
BspBS31I		Bacillus sp. BS31	5' GAAGAC; 3' CTTCTG	5' ---GAAGACNN NNNN--- 3'; 3' ---CTTCTGNNNNNN --- 5'
BspCI		Bacillus sp. C1	5' CGATCG; 3' GCTAGC	5' ---CGAT CG--- 3'; 3' ---GC TAGC--- 5'	Afa16RI, Afa22MI, EagBI, ErhB9I, NblI, Psu161I, RshI, XorII
BspCNI		Bacillus sp. 1310	5' CTCAG; 3' GAGTC	5' ---CTCAGN_{6}NNN --- 3'; 3' ---GAGTCN_{6}N NN--- 5'
BspDI		Bacillus sp.	5' ATCGAT; 3' TAGCTA	5' ---AT CGAT--- 3'; 3' ---TAGC TA--- 5'	AagI, BanIII, BavCI, Bsa29I, BseCI, Bsu15I, BsuTUI, ClaI, ZhoI
BspD6I	2P14	Bacillus sp. D6	5' GACTC; 3' CTGAG	5' ---GACTCNNNN NN--- 3'; 3' ---CTGAGNNNNNN --- 5'
BspEI		Bacillus sp.	5' TCCGGA; 3' AGGCCT	5' ---T CCGGA--- 3'; 3' ---AGGCC T--- 5'	AccIII, BlfI, BsiMI, Bsp13I, BspMII, CauB3I, MroI, PinBII
BspFI		Bacillus sp.	5' GATC; 3' CTAG	5' --- GATC--- 3'; 3' ---CTAG --- 5'	Bfi57I, Bsp2095I, **BspKT6I**, BtkII, DpnII, LlaAI, NlaII, SsiBI
BspF4I		Bacillus sp. F4	5' GGNCC; 3' CCNGG	5' ---G GNCC--- 3'; 3' ---CCNG G--- 5'	AsuI, Bac36I, BavBII, BsiZI, BspBII, CcuI, MaeK81II, PspPI
BspHI		Bacillus sp. H3	5' TCATGA; 3' AGTACT	5' ---T CATGA--- 3'; 3' ---AGTAC T--- 5'
BspIS4I		Bacillus sp. IS4	5' GAAGAC; 3' CTTCTG	5' ---GAAGACNN NNNN--- 3'; 3' ---CTTCTGNNNNNN --- 5'
BspJI		Bacillus sp.	5' GATC; 3' CTAG	5' --- GATC--- 3'; 3' ---CTAG --- 5'	BfuCI, Bsp2095I, **BspKT6I**, BtkII, DpnII, LlaAI, NmeCI, SsiAI
BspJII		Bacillus sp.	5' ATCGAT; 3' TAGCTA	5' ---AT CGAT--- 3'; 3' ---TAGC TA--- 5'	Bsa29I, BseCI, Bsp106I, BspDI, BspOVII, BspXI, BspZEI
BspKI		Bacillus sp. K	5' GGCC; 3' CCGG	5' ---GG CC--- 3'; 3' ---CC GG--- 5'
BspKT5I		Bacillus sp.	5' CTGAAG; 3' GACTTC	5' ---CTGAAGN_{12}NNNN --- 3'; 3' ---GACTTCN_{12}NN NN--- 5'
BspKT6I		Bacillus sp. KT6	5' GATC; 3' CTAG	5' ---GAT C--- 3'; 3' ---C TAG--- 5'	**BfuCI**, **Bsp2095I**, **Bst19II**, BstKTI, **DpnII**, **LlaAI**, **NmeCI**, **SsiAI**
BspKT8I		Bacillus sp. KT8	5' AAGCTT; 3' TTCGAA	5' ---A AGCTT--- 3'; 3' ---TTCGA A--- 5'
BspLI		Bacillus sp. RJ3-212	5' GGNNCC; 3' CCNNGG	5' ---GGN NCC--- 3'; 3' ---CCN NGG--- 5'	AspNI, BscBI, / BmiI, / NlaIV, PspN4I
BspLAI		Bacillus sp. LA	5' GCGC; 3' CGCG	5' ---GCG C--- 3'; 3' ---C GCG--- 5'	AspLEI, BstHHI, CfoI, FnuDIII, HhaI, **Hin6I**, **HinP1I**, **HsoI**, **HspAI**, **SciNI**
BspLAII		Bacillus sp. LA	5' TTCGAA; 3' AAGCTT	5' ---TT CGAA--- 3'; 3' ---AAGC TT--- 5'
BspLAIII		Bacillus sp. LA	5' AAGCTT; 3' TTCGAA	5' ---A AGCTT--- 3'; 3' ---TTCGA A--- 5'
BspLS2I		Bacillus sp. LS2	5' GDGCHC; 3' CHCGDG	5' ---GDGCH C--- 3'; 3' ---C HCGDG--- 5'	AocII, BmyI, BsoCI, BspLS2I, MhlI, NspII, SduI
BspLU4I		Bacillus sp. LU4	5' CYCGRG; 3' GRGCYC	5' ---C YCGRG--- 3'; 3' ---GRGCY C--- 5'	Ama87I, AvaI, Bse15I, BsoBI, BstSI, NspIII, NspSAI, OfoI
BspLU11I		Bacillus sp. LU11	5' ACATGT; 3' TGTACA	5' ---A CATGT--- 3'; 3' ---TGTAC A--- 5'
BspLU11III		Bacillus sp. LU11	5' GGGAC; 3' CCCTG	5' ---GGGACN_{8}NN NNNN--- 3'; 3' ---CCCTGN_{8}NNNNNN --- 5'
BspMI		Bacillus sp. M	5' ACCTGC; 3' TGGACG	5' ---ACCTGCNNNN NNNN--- 3'; 3' ---TGGACGNNNNNNNN --- 5'	Acc36I, BfuAI, BveI
BspMII		Bacillus sp. M	5' TCCGGA; 3' AGGCCT	5' ---T CCGGA--- 3'; 3' ---AGGCC T--- 5'	AccIII, BbvAIII, BlfI, BsiMI, BspEI, Bsu23I, CauB3I, MroI
BspM39I		Bacillus sp. M39	5' CAGCTG; 3' GTCGAC	5' ---CAG CTG--- 3'; 3' ---GTC GAC--- 5'
BspM90I		Bacillus sp. M90	5' GTATAC; 3' CATATG	5' ---GTA TAC--- 3'; 3' ---CAT ATG--- 5'
BspMAI		Bacillus stearothermophilus MA	5' CTGCAG; 3' GACGTC	5' ---CTGCA G--- 3'; 3' ---G ACGTC--- 5'	AjoI, Asp713I, BloHII, PaePI, Psp23I, PstI, SalPI, Sst12I, YenI
BspMKI		Bacillus sp. MKI	5' GTCGAC; 3' CAGCTG	5' ---G TCGAC--- 3'; 3' ---CAGCT G--- 5'
BspNI		Bacillus sp. N	5' CCWGG; 3' GGWCC	5' ---CC WGG--- 3'; 3' ---GGW CC--- 5'	AglI, BseBI, Bse17I, Bst2I, CbrI, CthII, **EcoRII**, MvaI, **SspAI**, TaqXI
BspO4I		Bacillus sp. O-4	5' CAGCTG; 3' GTCGAC	5' ---CAG CTG--- 3'; 3' ---GTC GAC--- 5'
BspOVI		Bacillus sp. OV	5' GACN_{5}GTC; 3' CTGN_{5}CAG	5' ---GACNNN NNGTC--- 3'; 3' ---CTGNN NNNCAG--- 5'	AhdI, AspEI, / BmeRI, / DriI, Eam1105I, EclHKI, NruGI
BspOVII		Bacillus sp. OV	5' ATCGAT; 3' TAGCTA	5' ---AT CGAT--- 3'; 3' ---TAGC TA--- 5'	BanIII, BavCI, BciBI, BcmI, Bli86I, BliRI, BspJII, BstNZ169I, SpmI
BspPI		Bacillus sp. d 1-34	5' GGATC; 3' CCTAG	5' ---GGATCNNNN N--- 3'; 3' ---CCTAGNNNNN --- 5'	AclWI, AlwI, BinI, / BsrWI, BstH9I, / Bst31TI, Bth617I, / EacI
BspRI		Bacillus sphaericus R	5' GGCC; 3' CCGG	5' ---GG CC--- 3'; 3' ---CC GG--- 5'
BspR7I		Bacillus sp. R7	5' CCTNAGG; 3' GGANTCC	5' ---CC TNAGG--- 3'; 3' ---GGANT CC--- 5'	AocI, AxyI, Bse21I, Bsu36I, Eco81I, MstII, SauI, SshAI
BspST5I		Bacillus sp. ST5	5' GCATC; 3' CGTAG	5' ---GCATCN_{4}N NNNN--- 3'; 3' ---CGTAGN_{4}NNNNN --- 5'
BspTI		Bacillus sp. RFL1265	5' CTTAAG; 3' GAATTC	5' ---C TTAAG--- 3'; 3' ---GAATT C--- 5'	AflII
BspT104I		Bacillus sp. T104	5' TTCGAA; 3' AAGCTT	5' ---TT CGAA--- 3'; 3' ---AAGC TT--- 5'	AcpI, Bim19I, Bpu14I, BstBI, Csp45I, LspI, NspV, SspRFI
BspT107I		Bacillus sp. T107	5' GGYRCC; 3' CCRYGG	5' ---G GYRCC--- 3'; 3' ---CCRYG G--- 5'	AccB1I, BanI, BbvBI, Eco64I, HgiCI, HgiHI, MspB4I, PfaAI
BspTNI		Bacillus sp. TN	5' GGTCTC; 3' CCAGAG	5' ---GGTCTCN NNNN--- 3'; 3' ---CCAGAGNNNNN --- 5'
BspTS514I		Bacillus sp. TS514	5' GAAGAC; 3' CTTCTG	5' ---GAAGACNN NNNN--- 3'; 3' ---CTTCTGNNNNNN --- 5'
BspWI		Bacillus sp. 3456	5' GCN_{7}GC; 3' CGN_{7}CG	5' ---GCNNNNN NNGC--- 3'; 3' ---CGNN NNNNNCG--- 5'
BspXI		Bacillus sphaericus X	5' ATCGAT; 3' TAGCTA	5' ---AT CGAT--- 3'; 3' ---TAGC TA--- 5'	BliAI, BliRI, BscI, Bst28I, Bsu15I, LcaI, PgaI, Ssp27144I, ZhoI
BspXII		Bacillus sphaericus X	5' TGATCA; 3' ACTAGT	5' ---T GATCA--- 3'; 3' ---ACTAG T--- 5'	AbaI, BclI, BsiQI, BstT7I, FbaI, Ksp22I, / ParI
BspZEI		Bacillus sp. ZE	5' ATCGAT; 3' TAGCTA	5' ---AT CGAT--- 3'; 3' ---TAGC TA--- 5'	Bsa29I, BseCI, BspDI, BspXI, Bst28I, BstNZ169I, BsuTUI, LplI

=== Bsr - Bss ===
**Enzyme**	**PDB code**	Source	**Recognition sequence**	**Cut**	**Isoschizomers**
BsrI		Bacillus stearothermophilus	5' ACTGG; 3' TGACC	5' ---ACTGGN --- 3'; 3' ---TGAC CN--- 5'
BsrAI		Bacillus stearothermophilus CPW7	5' GGWCC; 3' CCWGG	5' ---G GWCC--- 3'; 3' ---CCWG G--- 5'	BamNxI, BcuAI, Csp68KI, Eco47I, FssI, HgiCII, HgiJI, SinI
BsrBI		Bacillus stearothermophilus CPW193	5' CCGCTC; 3' GGCGAG	5' ---CCG CTC--- 3'; 3' ---GGC GAG--- 5'	AccBSI, BstD102I, Bst31NI, MbiI
BsrBRI		Bacillus stearothermophilus BR	5' GATN_{4}ATC; 3' CTAN_{4}TAG	5' ---GATNN NNATC--- 3'; 3' ---CTANN NNTAG--- 5'
BsrDI		Bacillus stearothermophilus D70	5' GCAATG; 3' CGTTAC	5' ---GCAATGNN --- 3'; 3' ---CGTTAC NN--- 5'
BsrFI		Bacillus stearothermophilus CPW16	5' RCCGGY; 3' YGGCCR	5' ---R CCGGY--- 3'; 3' ---YGGCC R--- 5'
BsrGI		Bacillus stearothermophilus GR75	5' TGTACA; 3' ACATGT	5' ---T GTACA--- 3'; 3' ---ACATG T--- 5'	AauI, / BsmRI, / Bsp1407I, BstAUI, Ssp4800I, SspBI
BsrSI		Bacillus stearothermophilus CPW19	5' ACTGG; 3' TGACC	5' ---ACTGGN --- 3'; 3' ---TGAC CN--- 5'
BssAI		Bacillus sp.	5' RCCGGY; 3' YGGCCR	5' ---R CCGGY--- 3'; 3' ---YGGCC R--- 5'
BssECI		Bacillus stearothermophilus EC	5' CCNNGG; 3' GGNNCC	5' ---C CNNGG--- 3'; 3' ---GGNNC C--- 5'
BssHI		Bacillus stearothermophilus H3	5' CTCGAG; 3' GAGCTC	5' ---C TCGAG--- 3'; 3' ---GAGCT C--- 5'	AbrI, BluI, BstVI, PanI, SauLPII, **SciI**, SlaI, StrI, TliI
BssHII		Bacillus stearothermophilus H3	5' GCGCGC; 3' CGCGCG	5' ---G CGCGC--- 3'; 3' ---CGCGC G--- 5'
BssIMI		Bacillus stearothermophilus IM	5' GGGTC; 3' CCCAG	5' ---GG GTC--- 3'; 3' ---CCCAG --- 5'
BssKI		Bacillus stearothermophilus TBI	5' CCNGG; 3' GGNCC	5' --- CCNGG--- 3'; 3' ---GGNCC --- 5'
BssNAI		Bacillus stearothermophilus NA	5' GTATAC; 3' CATATG	5' ---GTA TAC--- 3'; 3' ---CAT ATG--- 5'
BssNI		Bacillus sphaericus KTN	5' GRCGYC; 3' CYGCRG	5' ---GR CGYC--- 3'; 3' ---CYGC RG--- 5'	AcyI, AhaII, AosII, AstWI, AsuIII, BsaHI, HgiI, Hsp92I, Msp17I
BssSI		Bacillus stearothermophilus S719	5' CACGAG; 3' GTGCTC	5' ---C ACGAG--- 3'; 3' ---GTGCT C--- 5'
BssT1I		Bacillus stearothermophilus T1	5' CCWWGG; 3' GGWWCC	5' ---C CWWGG--- 3'; 3' ---GGWWC C--- 5'
