= Boxi =

Boxi may refer to:

- Abdur Rahim Boxi, Indian politician
- Li Boxi, Chinese footballer
- Liang Boxi (born 1938), Chinese diver
- BusinessObjects XI, or BOXI, an entreprise software product
- Boxi (薄奚), a Chinese surname
- BoxI, a restriction enzyme
