= Caroline Schauer =

- Born: 1969; Washington, DC, USA
- Spouse: Raymond Habas (m. 1998)

Academic background
- Education: BSc, chemistry, 1991, Beloit College; MSc, PhD, chemistry, Stony Brook University
- Thesis: The Development of Strategies for the Design and Synthesis of Molecular Solids (1997)

Caroline L. Schauer (born 1969) is an American engineer. She is the Margaret C. Burns Chair in Engineering and Head of the Department of Materials Science and Engineering at Drexel University. Schauer is a Fellow of the American Association for the Advancement of Science and American Institute for Medical and Biological Engineering.

== Early life and education ==
Schauer was born in 1969 in Washington, DC to Roland and Anne Schauer. She earned her Bachelor of Science in chemistry at Beloit College before enrolling at Stony Brook University for her Master of Science and PhD. Following her PhD, Schauer completed a postdoctoral fellowship at the University of Twente and another at Tufts University.

== Career ==
Following two years as an NRC postdoctoral fellow at the United States Naval Research Laboratory, Schauer joined the Department of Materials Science and Engineering at Drexel University in 2003. Upon joining Drexel, Schauer served as a departmental graduate advisor and developed and taught courses for undergraduate and graduate students. In 2018, she was promoted to Full professor and named the inaugural Associate Dean for Faculty Affairs. Schauer was appointed the inaugural Margaret C. Burns Chair in Engineering in 2021, and cross-appointed as the Interim Associate Vice Provost for Faculty Advancement. While serving in this role, Schauer collaborated with Ahmad Najafi and Christopher Sales to idenitfy a strain of Lysinibacillus sphaericus as a bio-healing agent. In 2025, Schauer was named head of the Department of Materials Science and Engineering.

== Awards and honors ==
Schauer was elected a Fellow of the American Institute for Medical and Biological Engineering in 2021 for her "contributions to natural polymer processing into nanoscale fibers and yarns for tissue engineering applications." In 2023, Schauer was the recipient of the 2023 AWIS Elizabeth W. Bingham Award from the Philadelphia chapter of the Association for Women in Science for "significantly influencing the advancement of women in science." She was also elected a 2025 Fellow of the American Association for the Advancement of Science for her "contributions to natural and synthetic polymer processing into nanoscale fibers and yarns for bone, skin and neuronal tissue engineering applications."

== Personal life ==
Schauer married Raymond Habas on May 30, 1998.
