= Exposing Microorganisms in the Stratosphere =

NASA research program

Exposing Microorganisms in the Stratosphere (E-MIST) is a NASA study to determine if a specific microorganism could survive conditions like those on the planet Mars. The study transported Bacillus pumilus bacteria and their spores by helium-filled balloon to the stratosphere of Earth (~31 km above sea level) and monitored the ability of the microorganisms to survive in extreme Martian-like conditions such as low pressure, dryness, cold, and ionizing radiation.

A test flight of the balloon and gondola was launched from New Mexico on 24 August 2014. A second, longer flight, took place on 10 October 2015.

== Overview ==
Microorganisms of every major biological lineage have been detected in Earth's upper atmosphere. If microbial metabolism, growth, or replication is achievable, independent of Earth's surface, then the search for habitable zones on other worlds should be broadened to include atmospheres. Moreover, measuring the endurance of spore-forming bacteria that were previously isolated from spacecraft assembly facilities, may help predict their survival on the surface of Mars and enhance planetary protection procedures.

The environmental conditions in the upper atmosphere resemble the surface conditions of Mars, especially in the stratosphere—10–50 km (6.2–31.1 mi) above sea level—that exhibits extreme cold, low pressure, desiccation, oxidation, and higher solar irradiation.

Beyond investigating viability alone, concerns of whether microorganisms can survive deep space conditions and potentially be transported to other planets, such as Mars, has long been a concern to scientists. To further this understanding, it is necessary to determine if there is a genomic (genetic) adaptation that occurs with survival in this extreme environment. Analysis of RNA could provide valuable insight into the functional effects on surviving microorganisms. For instance, this approach could help identify genes associated with repairing damage to the cell envelope, genome, and core metabolic proteins. The microorganism tested was Bacillus pumilus (strain SAFR-032), a resilient radiation-tolerant spore-forming bacteria isolated from a clean room environment in a NASA spacecraft assembly.

== Gondola ==
The 80-pound gondola features four doors that rotate to expose up to 10 experimental samples each for 8 hours. To terminate the flight, an explosive charge detonated, tearing a hole in the balloon. E-MIST and other science payloads attached to the balloon's gondola were returned to the surface under a parachute, where waiting researchers recovered the biological samples for analysis. Major payload components were a lithium-ion battery, an ultraviolet (UV) radiometer, humidity and temperatures sensors, and a flight computer.

== Results ==
After 8 hours exposure in the stratosphere (31 km above sea level), 99.9% of the entire population was destroyed. According to the researchers, "most terrestrial bacteria would be inactivated within the first [day] on Mars if contaminated spacecraft surfaces receive direct sunlight."

Of the 40 million spores exposed to the stratosphere, only 267 spores (or 0.0007%) remained viable. Extrapolating this, no viable spores would remain if flight samples had an additional 150 minutes of Sun exposure in the stratosphere (630 min total time). The survivors showed three single nucleotide (base pair) substitutions compared to unexposed controls kept on the ground. These three coding regions are associated with bacterial sporulation and metabolism. A similar observation was recorded on SAFR-032 samples that were exposed outside the International Space Station.

Even after cleaning, spacecraft leaving Earth still carry microorganisms on board that are embedded within surfaces, instruments, electronics, and other inaccessible areas that cannot be readily cleaned and are not exposed to direct sunlight, so there is a concern about the few survivors, which may be pushed in evolutionarily consequential directions. The researchers suggest that ultraviolet-C lamps (UVC LED arrays) could be embedded in lander spacecraft hardware to help sterilize their interior.

== Gallery ==
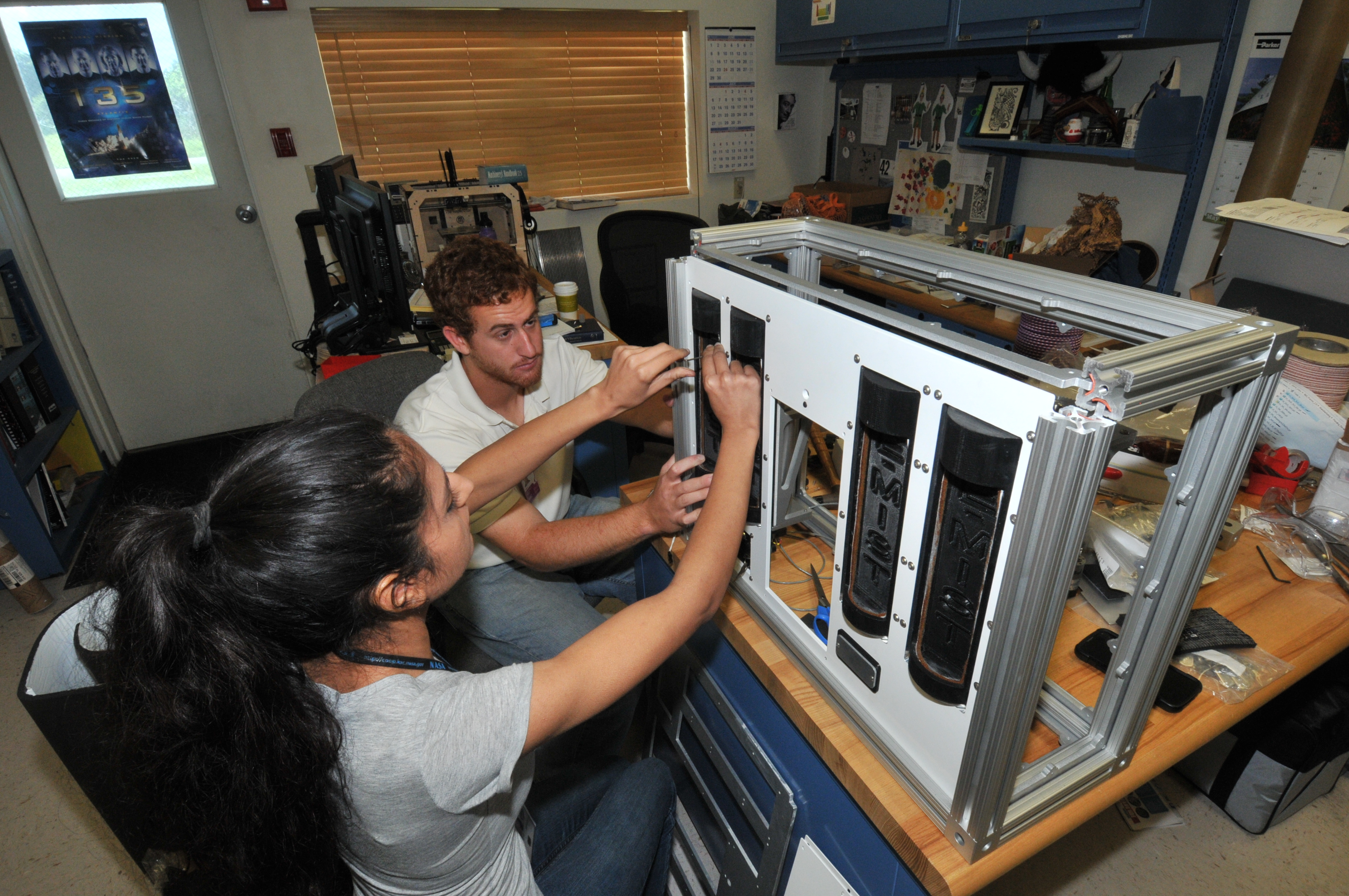
E-MIST study - preparing hardware.

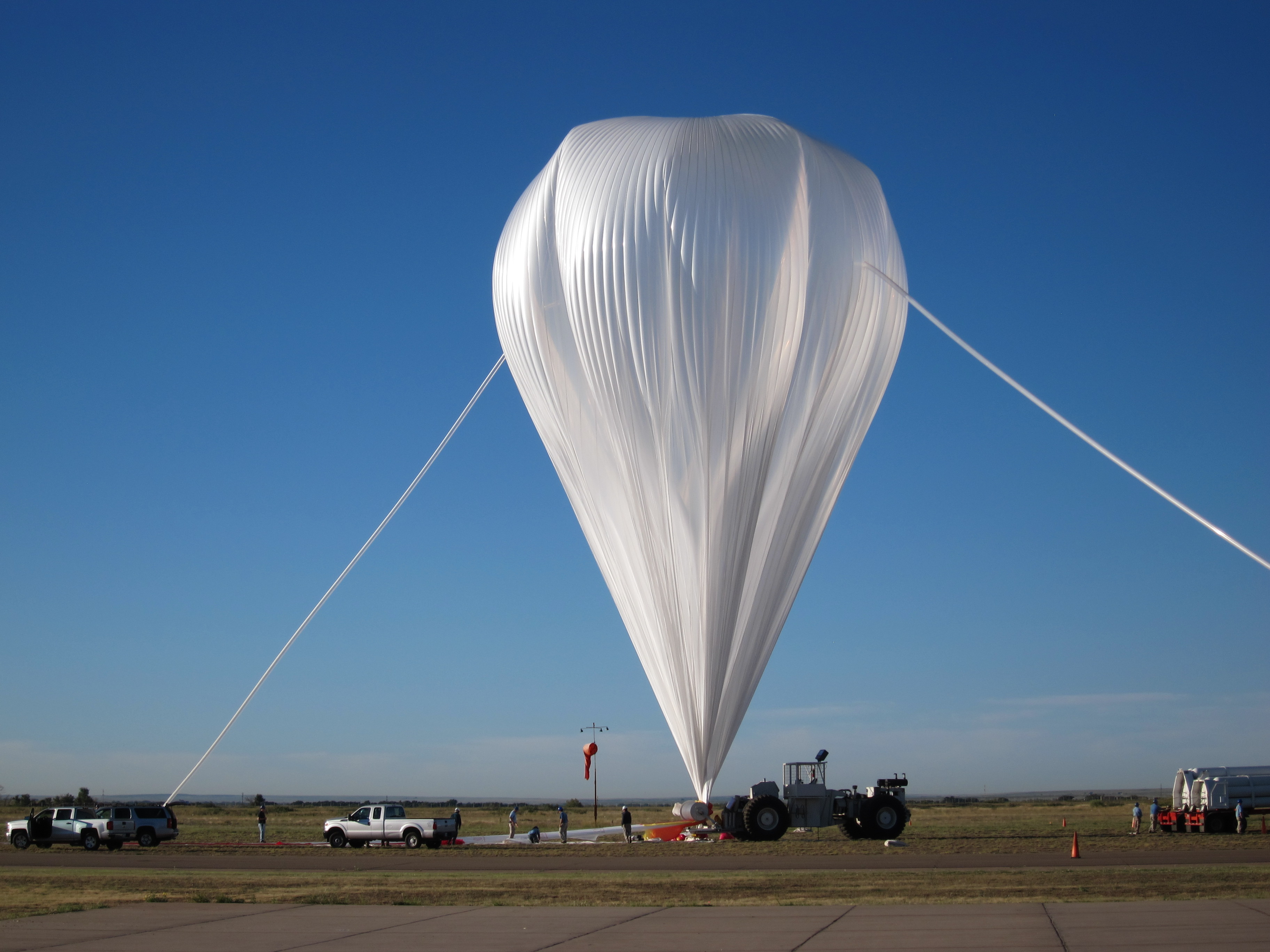
E-MIST study - scientific balloon.

== See also ==
- Extremophile
- Interplanetary contamination
- Life on Mars
- Panspermia
- Planetary protection
- Tersicoccus phoenicis
