= Hydrogenibacillus =

Scientific classification
- Domain: Bacteria
- Kingdom: Bacillati
- Phylum: Bacillota
- Class: Bacilli
- Order: Bacillales
- Family: Bacillaceae
- Genus: Hydrogenibacillus; Kämpfer et al. 2013

Type species
- Hydrogenibacillus schlegelii (Schenk & Aragno 1981) Kämpfer et al. 2013

Species
- H. schlegelii

Genus of bacteria

Hydrogenibacillus is a thermophilic and facultatively chemolithoautotrophic genus of bacteria from the family of Bacillaceae with one known species (Hydrogenibacillus schlegelii). Bacillus schlegelii was transferred to Hydrogenibacillus schlegelii
