= Biosorption =

Physiochemical process

Biosorption is a physicochemical process that occurs naturally in certain biomass which allows it to passively concentrate and bind contaminants onto its cellular structure. Biosorption can be defined as the ability of biological materials to accumulate heavy metals from wastewater through metabolically mediated or physico-chemical pathways of uptake. Though using biomass in environmental cleanup has been in practice for a while, scientists and engineers are hoping this phenomenon will provide an economical alternative for removing toxic heavy metals from industrial wastewater and aid in environmental remediation.

== Environmental uses ==
Pollution interacts naturally with biological systems. It is currently uncontrolled, seeping into any biological entity within the range of exposure. The most problematic contaminants include heavy metals, pesticides and other organic compounds which can be toxic to wildlife and humans in small concentration. There are existing methods for remediation, but they are expensive or ineffective. However, an extensive body of research has found that a wide variety of commonly discarded waste including eggshells, bones, peat, fungi, seaweed, crab shells, yeast, baggase and carrot peels can efficiently remove toxic heavy metal ions from contaminated water. Ions from metals like mercury can react in the environment to form harmful compounds like methylmercury, a compound known to be toxic in humans. In addition, adsorbing biomass, or biosorbents, can also remove other harmful metals like: arsenic, lead, cadmium, cobalt, chromium and uranium.

The idea of using biomass as a tool in environmental cleanup has been around since the early 1900s when Arden and Lockett discovered certain types of living bacteria cultures were capable of recovering nitrogen and phosphorus from raw sewage when it was mixed in an aeration tank. This discovery became known as the activated sludge process which is structured around the concept of bioaccumulation and is still widely used in wastewater treatment plants today. It wasn't until the late 1970s when scientists noticed the sequestering characteristic in dead biomass which resulted in a shift in research from bioaccumulation to biosorption.

== Differences from bioaccumulation ==
Though bioaccumulation and biosorption are used synonymously, they are very different in how they sequester contaminants:

Biosorption is a metabolically passive process, meaning it does not require energy, and the amount of contaminants a sorbent can remove is dependent on kinetic equilibrium and the composition of the sorbents cellular surface. Contaminants are adsorbed onto the cellular structure.

Bioaccumulation is an active metabolic process driven by energy from a living organism and requires respiration.

Both bioaccumulation and biosorption occur naturally in all living organisms however, in a controlled experiment conducted on living and dead strains of bacillus sphaericus it was found that the biosorption of chromium ions was 13–20% higher in dead cells than living cells.

In terms of environmental remediation, biosorption is preferable to bioaccumulation because it occurs at a faster rate and can produce higher concentrations. Since metals are bound onto the cellular surface, biosorption is a reversible process whereas bioaccumulation is only partially reversible.

== Factors affecting performance ==
Since biosorption is determined by equilibrium, it is largely influenced by pH, the concentration of biomass and the interaction between different metallic ions.

For example, in a study on the removal of pentachlorophenol (PCP) using different strains of fungal biomass, as the pH changed from low pH to high pH (acidic to basic) the amount of removal decreased by the majority of the strains, however one strain was unaffected by the change. In another study on the removal of copper, zinc and nickel ions using a composite sorbent as the pH increased from low to high the sorbent favored the removal of copper ions over the zinc and nickel ions. Because of the variability in sorbent this might be a drawback to biosorption, however, more research will be necessary.

== Common uses ==
Even though the term biosorption may be relatively new, it has been put to use in many applications for a long time. One very widely known use of biosorption is seen in activated carbon filters. They can filter air and water by allowing contaminants to bind to their incredibly porous and high surface area structure. The structure of the activated carbon is generated as the result of charcoal being treated with oxygen. Another type of carbon, sequestered carbon, can be used as a filtration media. It is made by carbon sequestration, which uses the opposite technique as for creating activated carbon. It is made by heating biomass in the absence of oxygen. The two filters allow for biosorption of different types of contaminants due to their chemical compositions—one with infused oxygen and the other without.

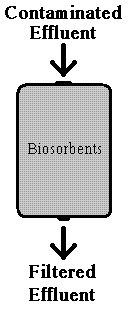
Figure 1. A Sorption Column Using Biosorbents.

== In industry ==
Many industrial effluents contain toxic metals that must be removed. Removal can be accomplished with biosorption techniques. It is an alternative to using man-made ion-exchange resins, which cost ten times more than biosorbents. The cost is so much less, because the biosorbents used are often waste from farms or they are very easy to regenerate, as is the case with seaweed and other unharvested biomass.

Industrious biosorption is often done by using sorption columns as seen in Figure 1. Effluent containing heavy metal ions is fed into a column from the top. The biosorbents adsorb the contaminants and let the ion-free effluent to exit the column at the bottom. The process can be reversed to collect a highly concentrated solution of metal contaminants. The biosorbents can then be re-used or discarded and replaced.
