= HUMARA assay =

HUMARA assay is one of the most widely used methods to determine the clonal origin of a tumor. The method is based on X chromosome inactivation and it takes advantage of the different methylation status of the gene HUMARA (short for human androgen receptor) located on the X chromosome. Considering the fact that once one X chromosome is inactivated in a cell, all other cells derived from it will have the same X chromosome inactivated, this approach becomes a tool to differentiate a monoclonal population from a polyclonal one in a female tissue. The HUMARA gene, in particular, has three important features that make it highly convenient for the purpose:

1. The gene is located on the X chromosome and it goes through inactivation by methylation in normal embryogenesis of a female infant. Because most genes on the X chromosome undergo inactivation, this feature is important.
2. Human androgen receptor gene alleles have varying numbers of CAG repeats. Thus, when DNA from a healthy female tissue is amplified by polymerase chain reaction (PCR) for a specific region of the gene, two separated bands can be seen on the gel.
3. The region that is amplified by PCR also has certain base orders that make it susceptible to be digested by HpaII (or HhaI) enzyme when it is not methylated. This detail gives the opportunity to researchers to differentiate a methylated allele from the unmethylated allele.

Due to these qualities of the HUMARA gene, clonal origin of any tissue from a female mammalian organism can be determined.

== Process ==
The basic process is as follows:

1. DNA from the tissue is isolated.
2. The isolated DNA is treated with the suitable enzyme (such as HpaII) in optimal conditions for a suggested amount of time (i.e. overnight).
3. DNA is cleaned and the isolated region of the HUMARA gene is amplified by PCR using "suitable" primers (as an example, please see: Ref. 2)
4. After running PCR products through a gel, the gel is visualized and the results are analyzed accordingly.

== Interpretation ==
If two bands are apparent, the tissue studied is most likely of polyclonal origin. If a single band is observed, the tissue is monoclonal unless two alleles have exactly the same numbers of CAG repeats or different cells with the same inactivated initiated the tumor; so, seemingly monoclonal although it is actually polyclonal.

In order to make a conclusion about the clonality of a tumor, the DNA from a normal tissue of the same person is taken, and a sample without enzyme treatment is amplified as a control. If a single band is observed even in normal tissues without enzyme treatment, it may be explained as follows: this person has the genetic pattern XO (this possibility can be excluded if a single band is observed after enzyme treatment because, if XO is indeed the genetic pattern of the sample, then there will be no methylation, and therefore no band should be visible after digesting with the enzyme. If a band is observed after enzyme treatment, the person most likely has two X chromosomes with the exact same CAG repeats.) When two bands appear for normal tissue (both enzyme treated and untreated), and two bands are observed for both the enzyme-treated tumor sample and for untreated tumor DNA, the tumor is polyclonal. However, if the same number of bands are observed with a single band after enzyme treatment, there is a high chance for the tumor to be monoclonal, though this is not certain as it is possible for both alleles to have the exact same CAG repeats.
