= BpuJI =

Restriction enzyme

BpuJI N terminal domain

Identifiers
- Symbol: BpuJI_N
- Pfam: PF11564
- InterPro: IPR021108
Available protein structures:
- PDB: IPR021108 PF11564 (ECOD; PDBsum)
- AlphaFold: IPR021108; PF11564

In molecular biology, BpuJI is a type II restriction endonuclease which recognises the asymmetric sequence 5'-CCCGT and cuts at multiple sites in the surrounding area of the target sequence. The BpuJI protein consists of two distinct modules; an N-terminal DNA recognition domain, and a C-terminal dimerisation and catalysis domain. The N-terminal domain is composed of two winged-helix subdomains and a disrupted linker subdomain. Target sequence recognition occurs through major groove contacts of amino acids in the winged-helix subdomains.
