= Cfr10I/Bse634I =

Family of restriction endonucleases

Bse634I
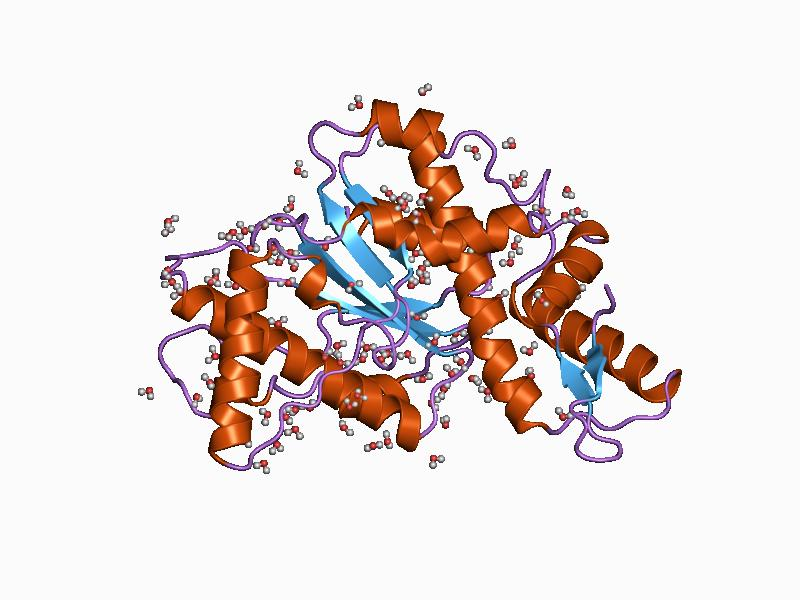
- crystal structure of citrobacter freundii restriction endonuclease cfr10i at 2.15 angstroms resolution.

Identifiers
- Symbol: Bse634I
- Pfam: PF07832
- InterPro: IPR012415
Available protein structures:
- PDB: IPR012415 PF07832 (ECOD; PDBsum)
- AlphaFold: IPR012415; PF07832

In molecular biology, the Cfr10I/Bse634I family of restriction endonucleases includes the type II restriction endonucleases Cfr10I and Bse634I. They exhibit a conserved tetrameric architecture that is of functional importance, wherein two dimers are arranged, back-to-back, with their putative DNA-binding clefts facing opposite directions. These clefts are formed between two monomers that interact, mainly via hydrophobic interactions supported by a few hydrogen bonds, to form a U-shaped dimer. Each monomer is folded to form a compact alpha-beta structure, whose core is made up of a five-stranded mixed beta-sheet. The monomer may be split into separate N-terminal and C-terminal subdomains at a hinge located in helix alpha3. Both Cfr10I and Bse634I recognise the double-stranded sequence RCCGGY and cleave after the purine R.

Recognition sequence     Cut
5' RCCGGY                5' ---R   CCGGY--- 3'
3' YGGCCR 	         3' ---YGGCC   R--- 5'
