= Liang Boxi =

Chinese diver and coach

Personal information
- Born: 1938 (age 86–87); Shunde, Guangdong, China

Sport
- Sport: Diving

Liang Boxi (Chinese: 梁伯熙; born 1938) is a former Chinese diver and a head coach of the Chinese diving team. He was among the first Chinese athletes to be awarded the title Master of Sport and is credited with revolutionising the sport of diving in China.

Liang was born in Shunde, Guangdong Province. In 1952, he enrolled in the Guangzhou Youth Swimming Team. Liang claimed his first championship title on the 3 meter springboard in a Guangzhou municipal contest in 1954, and was admitted to the Guangdong diving team the same year. He was one of the first divers to represent the People's Republic of China. From 1955 to 1965, Liang won 6 championships between the springboard and platform in national competitions, including the First Chinese National Games. He won an international champion on the springboard in 1963, and won both springboard and platform in an Asian competition in 1966. Liang became a diving coach in 1970, and he was promoted to head coach of Chinese national diving team in 1981. His students include Chen Xiaoxia, China's first world champion diver.
