= Isoschizomer =

Pair of restriction enzymes

Isoschizomers are pairs of restriction enzymes specific to the same recognition sequence. The term is derived from Greek iso 'same' and skihzo 'to split'.

The first enzyme discovered which recognizes a given sequence is known as the prototype; all subsequently identified enzymes that recognize that sequence are isoschizomers. For example, the prototype SphI (CGTAC/G) has the isoschizomers BbuI (CGTAC/G) and PaeI.

In some cases, only one out of a pair of isoschizomers can recognize both the methylated and unmethylated forms of restriction sites, whereas the other enzyme recognizes only the unmethylated form. This property of isoschizomers allows for the identification of methylation states. For example, the isoschizomers HpaII and MspI both recognize the sequence 5'-CCGG-3' when it is unmethylated. However, when the second C of the sequence is methylated, only MspI can recognize it.

An enzyme that recognizes the same sequence but cuts it in a different position is a neoschizomer. Neoschizomers are a subset of isoschizomers. For example, SmaI (CCC/GGG) and XmaI (C/CCGGG) are neoschizomers of each other. Similarly KpnI (GGTAC/C) and Acc65I (G/GTACC) are neoschizomers of each other. An enzyme that recognizes a slightly different sequence, but produces the same ends is an isocaudomer.
