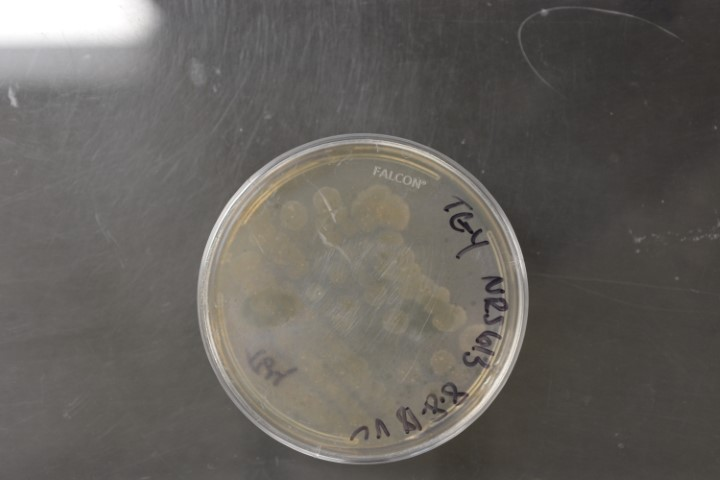

Scientific classification
- Domain: Bacteria
- Kingdom: Bacillati
- Phylum: Bacillota
- Class: Bacilli
- Order: Caryophanales
- Family: Bacillaceae
- Genus: Bacillus
- Species: B. firmus

Binomial name
- Bacillus firmus Bredemann and Werner 1933

= Bacillus firmus =

Species of bacterium

Bacillus firmus is an aerobic, Gram-positive, rod-shaped species of bacteria within the genus Bacillus. It is a soil-dwelling bacterium.

In past studies, various strains have also been isolated from wastewater and marine environments. Some strains of this species are very alkaline-tolerant and may grow in environments with pH as high as 11.

It was first identified in 1933 by Willy Ewald Günther Werner.

This species has been recently transferred into the genus Cytobacillus. The correct nomenclature is Cytobacillus firmus.

It is often used in agricultural and aquaculture settings as a disease control, specifically against nematodes, which are parasites that cause great harm to agricultural production worldwide. It has also been used for removing heavy metals from wastewater.

== Strains ==
Bacillus firmus I-1582 (Bf I-1582) was discovered to have a wide temperature range, but it ideally grows at a temperature around 35 °C. Its toxins can break down Meloidogyne eggs and colonize plant roots, where it can induce systemic resistance depending on the species of plant.

B. firmus DS-1 is a strain of Bacillus firmus isolated in 2014 from marine sediment off the South China Sea coast. The sequencing of its genome was very useful in understanding the mechanisms that allow the bacterium to function in agricultural capacities.

== Agricultural use ==
Bacillus firmus I-1582 (Bf I-1582) has proven to be an effective nematicide against nematodes such as Rodopholus similis, Xiphinema index, Heterodera sp., Ditylenchus sp., Tylenchulus semipenetrans and Meloidogyne sp. It is approved as a biological-based nematicide against root-knot nematodes in crops by the European Commission.

It has been used as a biopesticide to control Meloidogyne incognita, or southern root-knot nematode, and Pseudopyrenochaeta lycopersici, a fungal plant pathogen, on the growth of tomato crops in an integrated pest management environment. When applied independently and with the chemicals oxamyl and fosthiazate, Bf I-1582 was found to have suppressed both nematode and fungus populations.

While Bf I-1582 has been shown to be efficacious, information on its nematicidinal mechanism of action is limited. Its toxins can break down Meloidogyne eggs and colonize plant roots, where it can induce systemic resistance depending on the species of plant.

B. firmus DS-1 is a strain of Bacillus firmus isolated from marine environments in China. Prior to the isolation of this strain in 2014 and the sequencing of its genome, there was no reference genome sequence available, despite B. firmus's wide use as a controller of plant-parasitic nematodes (PPNs).

The draft genome sequence developed allowed researchers to further understand the exact biological mechanisms that grant B. firmus its nematicidal properties, as well as elucidate the evolutionary relationships between Bacillus strains of marine origin and those found in soil. One of these discoveries includes the identification of Sep1, a novel nematicidal virulence factor. This enzyme shows high toxicity against nematodes C. elegans and M. incognita. This nematicidal activity is dependent on its serine protease activity–it is an extracellular protease that can damage and destroy the physical barriers of nematodes (specifically the intestine and cuticle), effectively protecting against them.
