= Hydrogenibacillus schlegelii =

Scientific classification
- Domain: Bacteria
- Kingdom: Bacillati
- Phylum: Bacillota
- Class: Bacilli
- Order: Bacillales
- Family: Bacillaceae
- Genus: Hydrogenibacillus
- Species: H. schlegelii

Binomial name
- Hydrogenibacillus schlegelii (Schenk and Aragno 1981) Kämpfer et al. 2013

Synonyms
- Bacillus schlegelii Schenk and Aragno 1981

Species of bacterium

Hydrogenibacillus schlegelii is a Gram-positive species of bacteria. Strains of this species were originally isolated from a lake (Le Loclat) near St-Blaise, Neuchâtel, Switzerland. The species is thermophilic; strains isolated from soil in Antarctica were found to grow at temperatures between 59 and 72 °C.
