= HpaII =

Enzyme

HpaII (IntEnz: EC 3.1.21.4) is a restriction enzyme obtained from the microorganism Haemophilus parainfluenzae. It is a DNA restriction enzyme, therefore it has the ability to cut the DNA from certain region as demonstrated below. It has the ability to produce cohesive ends, which are rather useful in constructing plasmids.

Recognition sequence

5' CCGG
3' GGCC

Cut results

5' C  CGG
3' GGC  C

HpaII will not cut sites that have been methylated by SssI methyltransferase or HpaII methyltransferase. When the sites have been methylated by MspI methyltransferase, the enzyme will cut 300 times slower than unmethylated DNA and 50 times slower if the DNA is hemi-methylated. This feature is exploited for determination of the clonal origin of a mammalian female tumor through HUMARA assay.
