= Isocaudomer =

Pair of restriction enzymes

Isocaudomers are pairs of restriction enzymes that have slightly different recognition sequences, but upon cleavage of DNA, generate identical overhanging termini sequences. These sequences can be ligated to one another, but then form an asymmetrical sequence that cannot be cleaved by a restriction enzyme.

== Examples ==
For example the enzymes Mbo I and BamH I are isocaudomers:

Mbo I 
  N*GATC N
  N CTAG*N
BamH I
  G*GATC C
  C CTAG*G

N represents any of the four nucleotides. Independently of which nucleotide is present when cleaving with MboI, after cleavage with either enzyme, all termini have the central tetranucleotide - GATC. This allows fragments generated with one enzyme to anneal with fragments generated with the other enzyme. This can be used for elimination of restriction sites from the resulting DNA fragment. For example:

Not I
 GC*GGCC GC
 CG CCGG*CG
Bsp120 I
 G*GGCC C
 C CCGG*G

In the above example, both enzymes produce tetranucleotides CCGG which can anneal to one another. However, resulting DNA sequence will be:

 GCGGCCC
 CGCCGGG

where the nucleotides shown in italic originate from NotI-cut site, and those in bold from Bsp120I-cut one. Note that the resulting sequence is not recognised by either of the two enzymes.

Other examples of isocaudomers include:

BamHI/BclI/BglII/BstYI/DpnII
NcoI/BspHI/FatI/PciI
NdeI/AseI/BfaI/Csp6I/MseI
XbaI/AvrII/NheI/SpeI/StyI
XhoI/PspXI/SalI
