= Neoschizomer =

Type of restriction enzymes

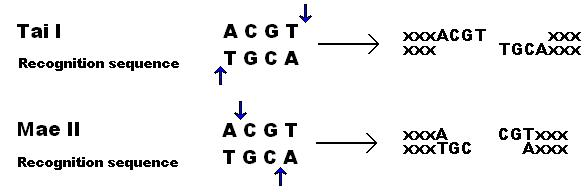
Recognition sequences and products of neoschizomers

Neoschizomers are restriction enzymes that recognize the same nucleotide sequence, but cleave at different sites. The first restriction enzyme discovered to recognize a sequence is called the prototype, and others that recognize the same sequence are isoschizomers. Neoschizomers are a subset of isoschizomers.

For example, MaeII is the prototype enzyme for the sequence "ACGT", with the cleavage site A↓CGT. One of its neoschizomers, Tsp49I, also recognizes the sequence "ACGT", but cleaves at ACGT↓.

Another example is SmaI (CCC↓GGG), which is a neoschizomer of XmaI (C↓CCGGG).

== See also ==
- Isoschizomer
- Isocaudomer
- List of restriction enzyme cutting sites
