= Bacillus pumilus =

Scientific classification
- Domain: Bacteria
- Kingdom: Bacillati
- Phylum: Bacillota
- Class: Bacilli
- Order: Caryophanales
- Family: Bacillaceae
- Genus: Bacillus
- Species: B. pumilus

Binomial name
- Bacillus pumilus Meyer and Gottheil 1901 (Approved Lists 1980)

Species of bacterium

Bacillus pumilus is a Gram-positive, aerobic, spore-forming bacillus commonly found in soil.

Bacillus pumilus spores—with the exception of mutant strain ATCC 7061—generally show high resistance to environmental stresses, including UV light exposure, desiccation, and the presence of oxidizers such as hydrogen peroxide. Strains of B. pumilus found at the NASA Jet Propulsion Laboratory were found to be particularly resistant to hydrogen peroxide.

A strain of B. pumilus isolated from black tiger shrimp (Penaeus monodon) was found to have high salt tolerance and to inhibit the growth of marine pathogens, including Vibrio alginolyticus, when cultured together.

== Genome and cell structure ==
Bacillus pumilus contains one circular chromosome including about 4000 genes and 3600-3900 proteins with varying length in the range of 3.7 to 3.8 Mbp. 41% of the DNA base pairs in B. pumilus are G-C. The cellular structure of B. pumilus is similar to other Bacillus species such as B. subtilis, B. megaterium, and B. cereus, the outer layer of the peptidoglycan cross-links in B. pumilus is covered by teichoic and lipoteichoic acids same as the most other Gram positive bacteria. These acids contain polyglycosyl phosphates with mono- and disaccharides as their monomers that can play a role in adhesion to different surfaces like the host cells. On the other hand, these phosphate groups on the surface of B. pumilus can provide net negative charge on the cell surface that allowing to capture some essential cations such as Ca2+ and Mg2+ that are necessary for cell life.

== Industrial use ==
Bacillus pumilus strain GB34 is used as an active ingredient in agricultural fungicides. Growth of the bacterium on plant roots prevents Rhizoctonia and Fusarium spores from germinating.

Bacillus pumilus (ATCC 27142) may be utilized (as a biological indicator or 'BI' for short) to monitor Gamma, Electron Beam (E-beam), or X-ray radiation sterilization processes. However, the relevance of this practice has dwindled rapidly in the last 30 years due to the discovery of wild-type organisms, like Deinococcus radiodurans, that have proven to have higher D-values and have unseated B. pumilus as recognized worst-case radiation challenge organism. As such, the International Standards Organization (ISO) no longer recognizes B. pumilus as a BI method of validation or routine monitoring of a terminal radiation sterilization process for medical devices labeled as 'sterile'. Instead, parametric means are recognized, using dosimetry to monitor delivered radiation dose. The dose is established using information about the number and types of viable microbes in/on the product and/or its sterile barrier system packaging. The industry term for these microbes as they relate to a sterile medical device is bioburden. Bioburden information coupled with dosimetry and subsequent tests of sterility are collectively used to perform verification dose experiments, which validate the terminal radiation sterilization dose. This dose supports the sterility assurance level (SAL) claim made by the product and its manufacturer. Most medical devices possess an SAL claim of 10E-6, that is one-in-one-million probability of [at least] one microbe making it through the sterilization process. The unit of measure for radiation dose for this purpose is kilogray, and a common radiation sterilization dose is 25 kilogray (kGy); however less or more dose is also quite common, as backed by validation data.

=== See also ===
- Bacillus marinus
- Bacillus lentimorbus
- Bacillus oleronius
