= Lysinibacillus sphaericus =

Scientific classification
- Domain: Bacteria
- Kingdom: Bacillati
- Phylum: Bacillota
- Class: Bacilli
- Order: Caryophanales
- Family: Caryophanaceae
- Genus: Lysinibacillus
- Species: L. sphaericus

Binomial name
- Lysinibacillus sphaericus (Meyer and Neide 1904) Ahmed et al. 2007

Species of bacterium

Lysinibacillus sphaericus (previously known as Bacillus sphaericus) is a Gram-positive, mesophilic, rod-shaped bacterium commonly found on soil. It can form resistant endospores that are tolerant to high temperatures, chemicals and ultraviolet light and can remain viable for long periods of time. It is of particular interest to the World Health Organization due to the larvicide effect of some strains against two mosquito genera (Culex and Anopheles), more effective than Bacillus thuringiensis, frequently used as a biological pest control. L. sphaericus cells in a vegetative state are also effective against Aedes aegypti larvae, an important vector of yellow fever and dengue viruses.

A bacterium similar to this species was found in a 25-million-year-old amber from the Dominican Republic. The endospore was successfully revived.

== Classification ==
The reclassification from Bacillus sphaericus to Lysinibacillus sphaericus is based on the fact that the Lysinibacillus genus, in contrast to the type species of the genus Bacillus, contains peptidoglycan with lysine, aspartic acid, alanine and glutamic acid.

L. sphaericus has five homology groups (I-V), with group II further dividing into subgroups IIA and IIB. Even before full genomes were known, these groups were proposed to represent distinct species, due to the low levels of homology between groups. In 2015, genome-scale studies by Xu et al show that the current species is paraphyletic and subsumes L. fusiformis and L. boronitolerans. GTDB's whole-genome comparison concurs in the need for splitting species.

== Biological pest control ==
The entomopathogenic strains are found in the homology subgroup IIA, nonetheless, this group contains also non pathogenic isolates The insecticidal activity of some strains of L. sphaericus was first discovered in 1965 and further studies have shown mosquitoes to be the major target of this bacterium. There are reports of activity against other organisms such as the nematode Trichostrongylus colubriformis to which it has lethal effects on the eggs. It is of important use in mosquito control programs worldwide and has high specificity against mosquito larvae in addition to being safe for mammals, fish, birds and nondipterean insects.

The high toxicity strains produce during sporulation a binary toxin composed of BinA (42 kDa) and BinB (51 kDa) proteins, which is the major insecticidal component. The protein BinB acts by binding to a receptor in the epithelial midgut cells, facilitating the entrance of BinA which causes cellular lysis. After being ingested by larvae, these proteins are solubilized in the gut and undergo proteolysis to active lower molecular weight derivatives. The vegetative cells of both high- and low-toxicity strains produce Mtx1, Mtx2 and Mtx3 toxins, but Mtx1 and Mtx2 are degraded by proteases during the stationary phase, consequently making them undetectable in sporulated cultures. In addition, the presence of binary-toxin genes and proteins has been determined in 18 pathogenic strains. Strains OT4b.2, OT4b.20, OT4b.25, OT4b.26 and OT4b.58 were found as toxic as the spores of the reference WHO strain 2362, against C. quinquefasciatus larvae.

== Bioremediation ==
=== Heavy metals ===
The bioremediation potential of L. sphaericus has been widely studied: strains with chromate reduction capacity have been isolated from different contaminated environments and naturally metal-rich soils. The strain JG-A12, isolated from uranium-mining waste piles in Germany, is also able to reversibly bind aluminium, cadmium, copper, lead and uranium. Different studies have shown that this ability is due to the presence of a proteinaceous surface covering these cells, called the S-layer, which is able to bind high quantities of heavy metals in saline solutions. The biotechnological potential among Colombian isolates IV(4)10 and OT4b.31 showed heavy metal biosorption in living and dead biomass. L. sphaericus strain CBAM5 showed resistance to 200 mM of arsenic which may be explained by the presence of the arsenate reductase gene.
