= Computational epigenetics =

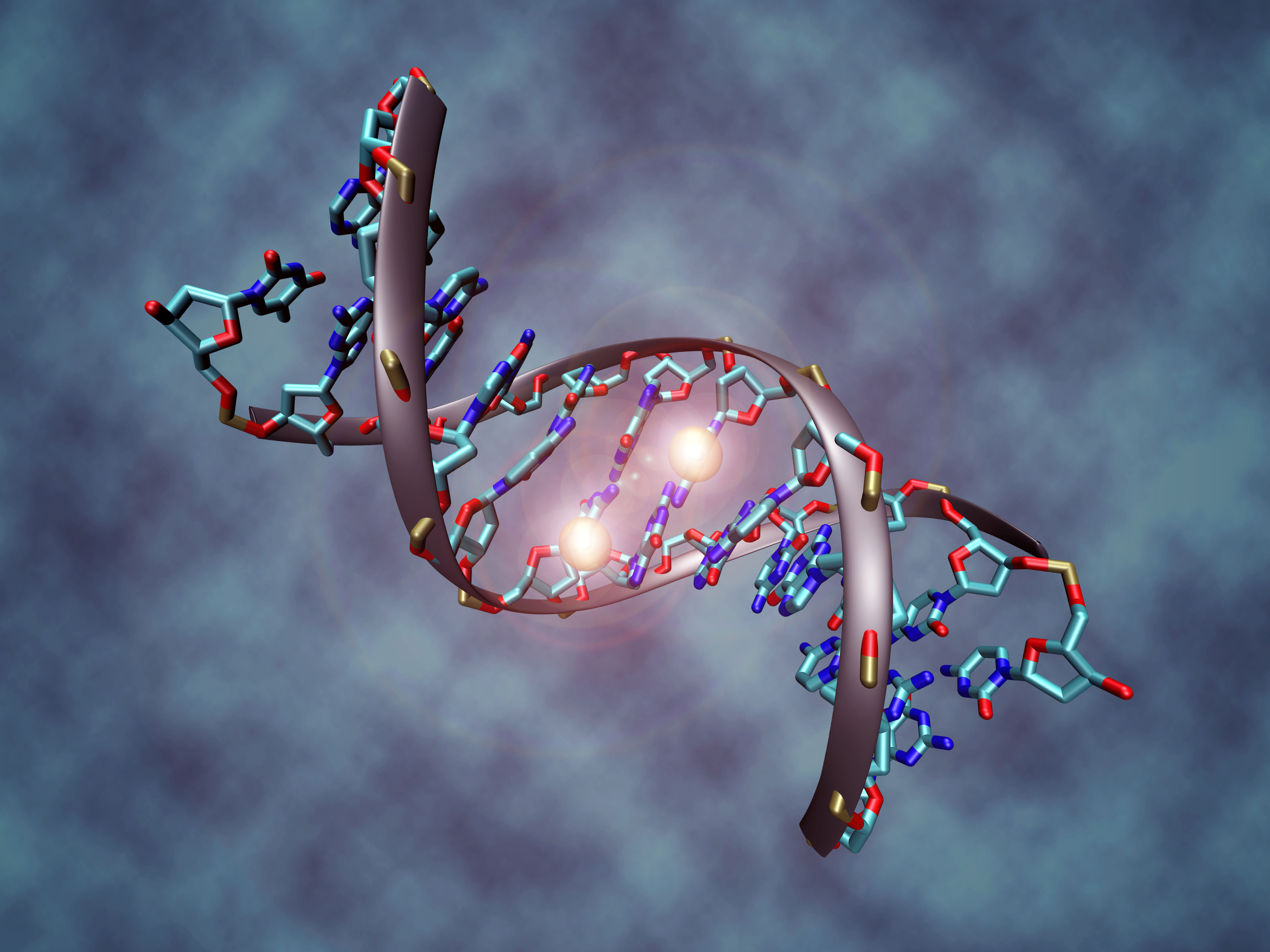
DNA methylation is an epigenetic mechanism that can be studied with bioinformatics.

Computational epigenetics or epi-informatics is a specialization of bioinformatics that uses statistical methods and mathematical modelling in epigenetic research. Due to the recent explosion of epigenome datasets, computational methods play an increasing role in all areas of epigenetic research.

Research in computational epigenetics comprises the development and application of bioinformatics methods for solving epigenetic questions, as well as computational data analysis and theoretical modeling in the context of epigenetics. This includes modelling of the effects of histone and DNA CpG island methylation.

== Current research areas ==
=== Importance ===
Computational methods and next-generation sequencing (NGS) technologies to are being employed to study DNA methylation and histone modifications, which are essential in cancer research. High-throughput sequencing offers valuable insights into epigenetic changes, and the growing volume of these datasets drives the continuous development of bioinformatics techniques for their effective management and analysis.

There is a need for data integration tools that can merge various types of epigenetic modifications and -omics data (including transcriptomics, genomics, epigenomics, and proteomics) to gain a comprehensive understanding of biological processes. This requires the standardization, annotation, and harmonization of epigenetic data, along with the enhancement of computational and machine learning approaches.

Understanding the functional implications of epigenetics in diseases can be greatly advanced by using epigenetic editing tools, such as CRISPR-dCas9 technology. These tools enable precise modifications of epigenetic marks at specific loci, allowing researchers to assess the effects of these alterations in cellular and animal models, thus complementing insights obtained from computational analyses.

=== Data processing and analysis ===
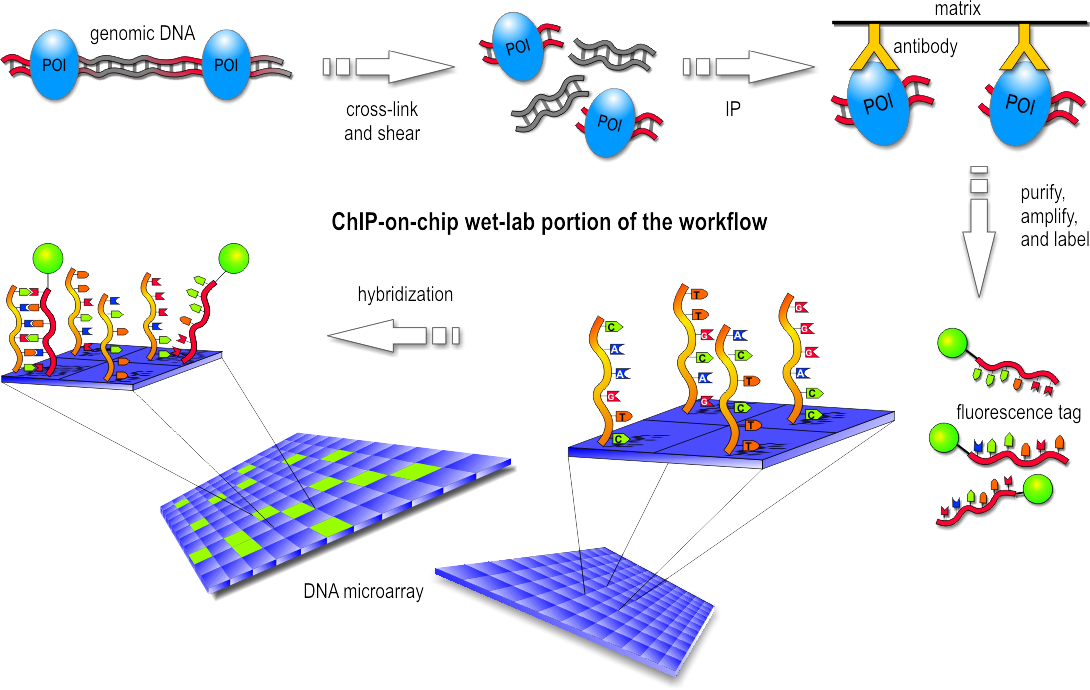
ChIP-on-chip technique

Various experimental techniques have been developed for genome-wide mapping of epigenetic information, the most widely used being ChIP-on-chip, ChIP-seq and bisulfite sequencing. All of these methods generate large amounts of data and require efficient ways of data processing and quality control by bioinformatic methods.

=== Predictions ===
A substantial amount of bioinformatic research has been devoted to the prediction of epigenetic information from characteristics of the genome sequence. Such predictions serve a dual purpose. First, accurate epigenome predictions can substitute for experimental data, to some degree, which is particularly relevant for newly discovered epigenetic mechanisms and for species other than human and mouse. Second, prediction algorithms build statistical models of epigenetic information from training data and can therefore act as a first step toward quantitative modeling of an epigenetic mechanism. Successful computational prediction of DNA and lysine methylation and acetylation has been achieved by combinations of various features.

=== Applications in cancer epigenetics ===
The important role of epigenetic defects for cancer opens up new opportunities for improved diagnosis and therapy. These active areas of research give rise to two questions that are particularly amenable to bioinformatic analysis. First, given a list of genomic regions exhibiting epigenetic differences between tumor cells and controls (or between different disease subtypes), can we detect common patterns or find evidence of a functional relationship of these regions to cancer? Second, can we use bioinformatic methods in order to improve diagnosis and therapy by detecting and classifying important disease subtypes?

== Emerging topics ==
The first wave of research in the field of computational epigenetics was driven by rapid progress of experimental methods for data generation, which required adequate computational methods for data processing and quality control, prompted epigenome prediction studies as a means of understanding the genomic distribution of epigenetic information, and provided the foundation for initial projects on cancer epigenetics. While these topics will continue to be major areas of research and the mere quantity of epigenetic data arising from epigenome projects poses a significant bioinformatic challenge, several additional topics are currently emerging.

- Epigenetic regulatory circuitry: Reverse engineering the regulatory networks that read, write and execute epigenetic codes.
- Population epigenetics: Distilling regulatory mechanisms from the integration of epigenome data with gene expression profiles and haplotype maps for a large sample from a heterogeneous population.
- Evolutionary epigenetics: Learning about epigenome regulation in human (and its medical consequences) by cross-species comparisons.
- Theoretical modeling: Testing our mechanistic and quantitative understanding of epigenetic mechanisms by in silico simulation.
- Genome browsers: Developing a new blend of web services that enable biologists to perform sophisticated genome and epigenome analysis within an easy-to-use genome browser environment.
- Medical epigenetics: Searching for epigenetic mechanisms that play a role in diseases other than cancer, as there is strong circumstantial evidence for epigenetic regulation being involved in mental disorders, autoimmune diseases and other complex diseases.

== Data portals and projects ==
Epigenomic Data Portals and Projects
Name	Description	Link
IHEC Data Portal	Offers a comprehensive list of reference epigenomes for humans (hg19, hg38) and mice (mm10).	IHEC Portal
NIH ROADMAP Epigenomics Mapping Consortium	Provides genome-wide maps of histone modifications, chromatin accessibility, DNA methylation, and mRNA expression across various human cell types and tissues.	ROADMAP Portal
CEEHRC	A Canadian initiative that provides detailed information on human epigenomes from different tissues.	CEEHRC Portal
BLUEPRINT	A European project generating epigenomic maps for 100 different blood types.	BLUEPRINT Portal
IHEC CREST	Focuses on reference genomes for human epithelial, vascular endothelial, and reproductive cells.	CREST Portal
DeepBlue	A central database designed for programmatic operations on epigenetic data, including data overlapping and aggregation.	DeepBlue Portal
Epigenome Browser	Supplies reference sequences and draft assemblies for a diverse range of genomes.	Epigenome Browser
WashU Epigenome Browser	Offers extensive epigenomic information for various species, including cows and fruit flies, in addition to humans and mice.	WashU Portal
ENCODE Project	An NIH-funded initiative aimed at mapping all functional elements of the human genome.	ENCODE Portal
GenExp	An interactive genome browser that integrates data from the Distributed Annotation System (DAS).	GenExp Portal
AHEAD Task Force	A systematic effort to map the human epigenome, creating bioinformatics networks for reference guides related to normal tissues.	
HEP Project Consortium	Provides high-resolution epigenome data for analyzing DNA methylation in 43 individuals.	HEP
HEROIC Project Consortium	Focuses on high-throughput studies of epigenetic regulation using various genomic assays.	HEROIC Portal
dbEM	A database that examines the role of epigenetic proteins in oncogenesis, featuring data on mutations and gene expression across tumor samples.	dbEM Portal
EpiFactors	A database linking specific epigenetic factors to corresponding genes.	EpiFactors Portal
HEDD	Concentrates on the storage and integration of datasets related to epigenetic drugs.	HEDD Portal

== Databases ==
DNA Methylation and Epigenetic Databases
Name	Description	Citation
MethDB	Contains information on 19,905 DNA methylation content data and 5,382 methylation patterns for 48 species, 1,511 individuals, 198 tissues and cell lines, and 79 phenotypes.	
Pubmeth	Contains over 5,000 records on methylated genes in various cancer types.	
REBASE	Contains over 22,000 DNA methyltransferases genes derived from GenBank.	
DeepBlue Epigenomic Database	Contains epigenomic data from more than 60,000 experiments from different IHEC members, divided into various epigenetic marks. DeepBlue also provides an API for access and processing of the data.	
MeInfoText	Contains gene methylation information across 205 human cancer types.	
MethPrimerDB	Contains 259 primer sets from human, mouse, and rat for DNA methylation analysis.	
The Histone Database	Contains 254 sequences from histone H1, 383 from histone H2, 311 from histone H2B, 1043 from histone H3, and 198 from histone H4, representing at least 857 species.	
ChromDB	Contains 9,341 chromatin-associated proteins, including RNAi-associated proteins, for a broad range of organisms.	
CREMOFAC	Contains 1,725 redundant and 720 non-redundant chromatin-remodeling factor sequences in eukaryotes.	
The Krembil Family Epigenetics Laboratory	Contains DNA methylation data of human chromosomes 21, 22, male germ cells, and DNA methylation profiles in monozygotic and dizygotic twins.	
MethyLogiX DNA methylation database	Contains DNA methylation data of human chromosomes 21 and 22, male germ cells, and late-onset Alzheimer's disease.	

== Sources and further reading ==
- The original version of this article was based on a review paper on computational epigenetics that appeared in the January 2008 issue of the Bioinformatics journal: Bock C, Lengauer T (January 2008). "Computational epigenetics". Bioinformatics. 24 (1): 1–10. doi:10.1093/bioinformatics/btm546. PMID 18024971.. This review paper provides >100 references to scientific papers and extensive background information.
