= Pedro Oliveira (academic) =

Portuguese innovation scholar (born 1971)

- Born: December 3, 1971 (age 54); Bangui, Central African Republic
- Known for: Dean at Nova School of Business and Economics; Founder and leader of Patient Innovation
- Scientific career
- Fields: User Innovation; Patient Innovation
- Institutions: Nova School of Business and Economics, Copenhagen Business School & Patient Innovation

Pedro Oliveira (born December 3, 1971, in Bangui, Central African Republic) is a Portuguese innovation scholar who is Dean of Nova School of Business and Economics for the period 2023-26, succeeding Daniel Traça. He is also Calouste Gulbenkian Foundation Chair Professor for the Impact Economy and Full Professor at Nova School of Business and Economics, professor with special responsibilities at Copenhagen Business School, and an entrepreneur. Previously he was a professor of Technology and Innovation Management at Católica Lisbon School of Business & Economics. He is also an Academic Scholar at the Cornell Institute of Healthy Futures. Oliveira was Senior Associate Dean for Faculty and Research at the Católica Lisbon School of Business and Economics and an International Faculty Fellow at MIT Sloan School of Management, where he worked with Eric von Hippel. He received his PhD in Operations, Technology and Innovation Management from the University of North Carolina at Chapel Hill. He is best-known for his work in the notion of patient innovation and for founding the Patient Innovation platform.

== Main Achievements ==
- Dean of Nova School of Business and Economics (2023–26)
- Appointed Calouste Gulbenkian Foundation Chair Professor for the Impact Economy & Invited Full Professor at Nova School of Business and Economics.
- Founder and project leader of Patient Innovation, a platform that brings together patients and caregivers to share innovation solutions developed by themselves to help them cope with their disease. His initiative goes further recognizing that patients and caregivers are innovators in their own right and Pedro became an advocate for patients' right to innovate.
- His project (Patient Innovation) has received the support from patients and patient associations from around the globe, notable scientists such as Prof. Robert Langer, or Nobel Laureates Prof. Aaron Ciechanover and Sir Richard J. Roberts. In an interview to HuffingtonPost, Roberts said about Pedro Oliveira: "I first heard of Patient Innovation as a result of my meeting a Portuguese man Pedro Oliveira, who is a very impressive guy. He introduced me to a local journalist in Lisbon and a few of their friends including a doctor and some others including academics from the Sloan School at MIT. They had noticed that there were quite a few non-medical people who were doing really innovative stuff in healthcare to make lives easier for people with handicaps, or with serious medical conditions. Many of these things were so different from anything a doctor would have ever said that they thought that it would be good if they could put together some kind of network where people who came up with these kind of ideas could advertise them and could share them with other patients who might benefit. I thought that was just a great idea, especially since I love this sort of maverick approach to medicine or science or anything else".
- European Commissioner Carlos Moedas made the following remarks: "I think what you've achieved is nothing less than astonishing! The simplest innovations are the game-changers. And game-changing innovation doesn't always come easily to a sacred profession like medicine. Not many people are willing to put in the effort it takes to prove something can be done differently. Particularly, when the world around you seems to think that 'the way it's always been done' is probably good enough. So I congratulate you − I respect you immensely − for being the pro-wrestlers of change! The heavy-weights of patient innovation! I can't wait to see what the future has in store for this project and its impacts on citizens!"
- In December 2014, he was named (by Jornal i, a Portuguese newspaper) as "one of the 14 Portuguese citizens who contributed to change the world for the better" due his work on the Patient Innovation Project.
- On 14 January 2016 he was distinguished, together with Daniel Traça, Dean of Nova SBE, as "Personality of the Year in Education in Portugal" and received an Amadeus Brighter Award.
- The London Science Museum has selected Pedro Oliveira's project Patient Innovation as one of seven case studies to be featured in the exhibition 'Beyond the Lab: The DIY Science Revolution' which opened on July 7, 2016, in London and will visit 29 European countries until the end of 2018.
- Pedro Oliveira's project was also one of 5 projects featured at the "Summit on Science and Technology Enablement for the Sustainable Development Goals” (November 29, 2016) as an example of "Commitments to Collective Action”. This was because "Patient Innovation is already contributing to two of the UN’s Sustainable Development Goals: #3- Good Health and Well-being & 9- Industry, Innovation and Infrastructure." Secretary General Ban Ki-moon (United Nations) opened the Summit.
- In December 2016 Patient Innovation won the Healthcare Startup Awards and was named "Non-Profit Startup of The Year” by the HealthCare Startup Society.
- AACSB recognized Patient Innovation as Entrepreneurship Spotlight Challenge Honoree (2017).
- Patient Innovation won the Santa Casa Challenge.
- Red Heering selected Patient Innovation as a finalist of the Red Herring Top 100 awards.
- He is co-founder of the leading crowdfunding platform in Portugal (PPL Crowdfunding Portugal).

== Innovation by patients ==
He is best known for his work in the notion of patient innovation. He found that patients of chronic diseases frequently develop valuable solutions to improve their quality of life and treat their diseases, something saving their own lives. These innovations usually occur behind closed doors and might never be known or used by someone else. However, if successful innovations were shared with other patients and caregivers with similar needs, they could improve the lives of many others. His online platform shared over 5000 innovations developed by patients or caregivers from over 100 countries.
