= Polbase =

Database of DNA polymerases

Content
- Description: Comprehensive database covering various aspects of DNA polymerases
- Data types captured: Biology, biochemistry and structure of DNA polymerases
- Organisms: Polbase organisms list

Contact
- Research center: New England Biolabs
- Authors: Brad Langhorst and Nicole Nichols
- Primary citation: PMID 21993301

Access
- Website: Polbase

Polbase (DNA Polymerase Database) is an open repository of DNA polymerase information. Polbase captures information from published research on polymerase activity, and presents it in context with related work. Polbase is a comprehensive repository from the 1950s to the present and includes hundreds of polymerases and their related mutants. Polbase's collaborative model allows polymerase investigators to complete, correct and validate Polbase's representation of their work.

== Content ==
Polbase features a listing of known polymerases categorized by organism, polymerase family, and selected properties. Each indexed polymerase has its own snapshot page containing links to all its information in the database. All results in Polbase are stored with the relevant experimental details to put them into context. If structure information is available, Polbase links to the polymerase's Protein Data Bank (PDB) entry. All information gathered in Polbase is linked to the original publication where it was reported.

== Information sources ==
Polbase draws information from a variety of sources including PubMed, PDB, and directly from polymerase investigators.

== Interconnections ==
Polbase is connected with various other databases. These include:

- The Protein Data Bank
- European Bioinformatics Institute
- ExPASy Bioinformatics Resource Portal
- UniProt
- BRENDA
- PubMed
- Various Scientific Journals

== History ==
Polbase began in March 2009 with a grant from the NIH's SBIR program and was first presented to the public at MIT's DNA and Mutagenesis Meeting In March 2010 Polbase was presented to a larger audience at the Evolving Polymerases 2010 Conference. Polbase was also presented in more technical detail at the Rocky 2010 ISMB Conference. Polbase is described in more detail in the 2012 Nucleic Acids Research Database Issue.

Polbase was built at New England Biolabs by Brad Langhorst and Nicole Nichols with the help of founding collaborators Linda Reha-Krantz, Bill Jack, Cathy Joyce, Stu Linn, Stefan Sarafianos, Sam Wilson, and Roger Woodgate.
