= Nova School of Business and Economics =

Business school in Portugal

Coordinates: 38°43′59″N 9°09′38″W

Nova School of Business & Economics
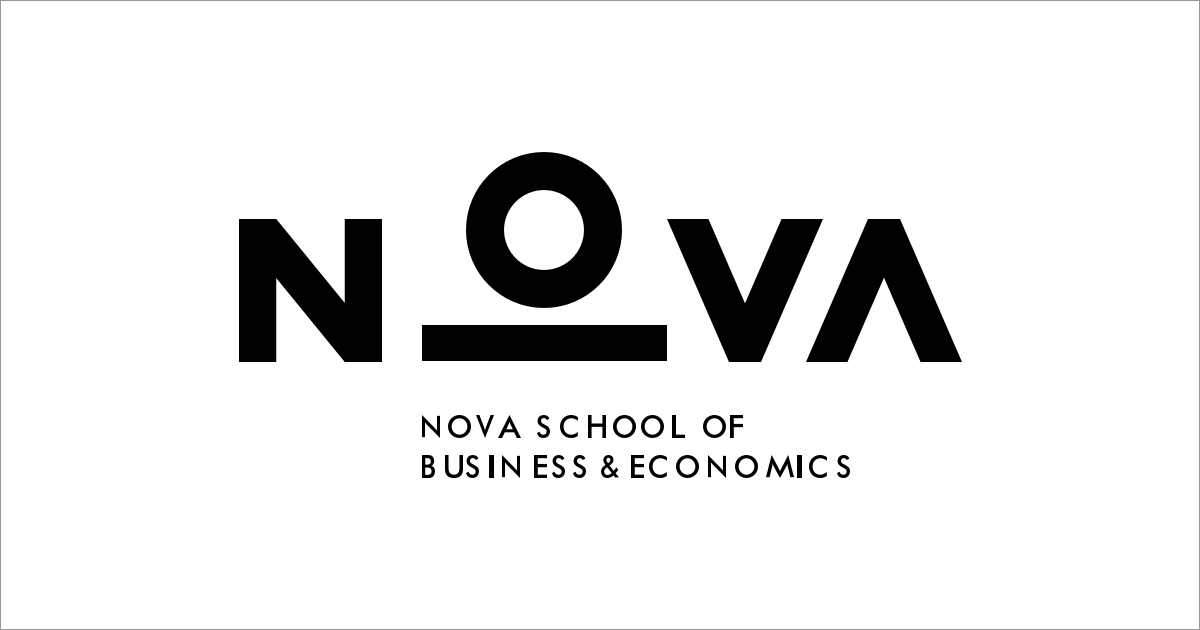
- Former name: Faculdade de Economia da Universidade Nova de Lisboa
- Motto: A Clear Horizon
- Type: Public school
- Established: 1978
- Parent institution: Universidade NOVA de Lisboa and Alfredo de Sousa Foundation
- Affiliations: AMBA, CEMS, EQUIS, AACSB
- Dean: Pedro Oliveira, Ph.D
- Academic staff: 300
- Administrative staff: 150
- Students: 3200
- Undergraduates: 1500
- Postgraduates: 1600
- Doctoral students: 100
- Location: Campus de Carcavelos, Rua da Holanda, n.1, 2775-405 Carcavelos, Cascais, Portugal
- Campus: Carcavelos Campus
- Language: Portuguese and English
- Colours: Black, White, Red and Blue
- Website: https://www2.novasbe.unl.pt/en/

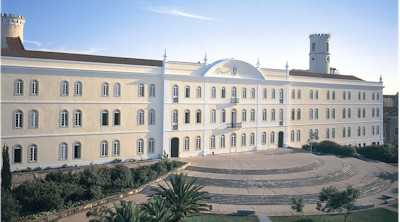
Nova SBE's previous main building in Campolide.

NOVA School of Business and Economics (NOVA SBE), formerly the Faculty of Economics of the New University of Lisbon, is one of the five faculties of the New University of Lisbon (UNL). It is dedicated to teaching and research in economics, finance and business management.

Founded in 1978, it holds triple accreditation. Its International Master's in Management was ranked 2nd worldwide by the Financial Times in 2026, and the school placed 17th in the newspaper's 2025 ranking of European business schools.

The faculty is based at the Carcavelos Campus, facing the Fort of São Julião da Barra.

== History ==
NOVA SBE is one of the five faculties of the UNL, a university established on 11 August 1973.

In 2007, together with Católica Lisbon School of Business & Economics and the Sloan School of Management of the Massachusetts Institute of Technology (MIT), it launched The Lisbon MBA programme, a master’s degree in management aimed at preparing future leaders and entrepreneurs to face global business challenges.

In 2012, the faculty adopted the name “NOVA School of Business and Economics”, which is currently used both in Portugal and internationally.

On 29 September 2018, the faculty moved to the Carcavelos Campus, described by Observador at its opening as the most modern campus in Europe. On the date of its inauguration, it was awarded the title of Honorary Member of the Order of Public Instruction by the President of the Republic, Marcelo Rebelo de Sousa.

In January 2023, Pedro Oliveira succeeded Daniel Traça as dean, following Traça's eight years in the role.

== Teaching ==
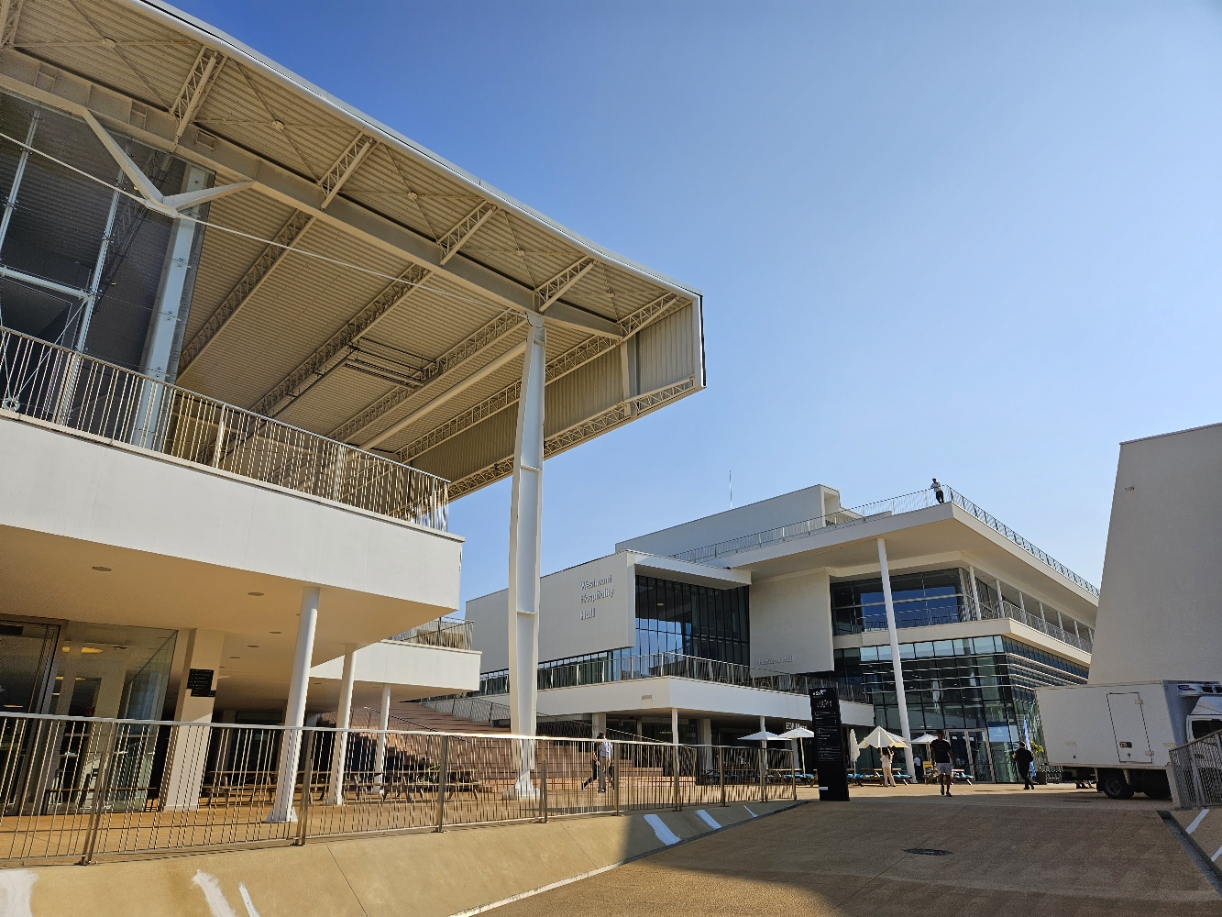
NOVA SBE campus in Carcavelos.

NOVA SBE adopts English as the primary language of instruction at all academic levels. Nevertheless, the first year of undergraduate programmes may be completed partially or entirely in Portuguese.

The faculty offers undergraduate programmes in Economics and Management, master’s degrees, doctoral programmes, an MBA and executive education programmes.

== Rankings and accreditations ==
NOVA SBE holds the three main international accreditations in management education (AACSB, AMBA and EQUIS), granting it the so-called “Triple Crown”.

In the 2026 Financial Times Masters in Management ranking, the school's International Master's in Management placed 2nd worldwide, behind the University of St. Gallen. The programme rose from 23rd place in 2021, and Nova SBE was the highest-placed of five Portuguese schools in the table. Its International Master's in Finance placed 8th worldwide in 2026, down from 6th the previous year.

The school's position in the Financial Times aggregate European Business Schools ranking, which combines the results of the Masters in Management, Global MBA, Executive MBA and Executive Education rankings, has been as follows:

Year	FT European Business Schools
2025	17
2024	18
2023	21
2020	26

In 2024 its component placements in that ranking were 7th for the International Master in Management, 11th for customised executive education, 24th for The Lisbon MBA, 26th for open executive education and 28th for The Lisbon MBA Executive.

== Notable faculty ==
- Maria do Carmo Seabra, Minister of Education in the XVI Constitutional Government.
- Pedro Oliveira, Dean and founder of Patient Innovation.
