= Patient Innovation =

- Website type: Open database of innovations developed by patients and caregivers
- Available in: Multilingual
- Owner: Patient Innovation Association (non-profit)
- Creator: Pedro Oliveira
- Revenue: Non-profit
- Website: patient-innovation.com
- Registration: Optional
- Launched: 7 February 2014
- Current status: Active

Patient Innovation is a website that shares solutions and ideas developed by patients and informal caregivers for managing personal health issues. It is a non-profit and also provides rating tools and options to report and track modified solutions that these individuals develop.

== History ==
Patient Innovation started as an academic research project aimed to study user innovation by patients and their non-professional caregivers, funded by The Portuguese Science and Technology Foundation (FCT), Carnegie-Mellon Portugal Program and Pieter Pribila Foundation. The project was founded by two Portuguese academics and researchers Pedro Oliveira and Helena Canhão.

As one of the project's outcomes, the online platform was launched on February 7, 2014, at an inaugural event in Lisbon, Portugal. The project is supported by a number of distinguished individuals, including Nobel Laureate Sir Richard J. Roberts, Eric von Hippel, Nobel Laureate Aaron Ciechanover, Katherine Strandburg, Robert Langer, Lee Fleming and Keld Laursen – who serve on the Advisory Board.

== Administration ==
Patient Innovation is led by Prof. Pedro Oliveira from Copenhagen Business School and Prof. Helena Canhão from the FCM - NOVA Medical School. The project team includes medical doctors from FCM - NOVA Medical School.

Patient Innovation terms of use include the agreement that users do not include the content that promote "self-mutilation, eating disorders or hard drug abuse". To enforce the terms of service, all the submitted solutions go through a screening by the project's medical team, who check whether for submission complies with the terms and services advertised on the Patient Innovation site. Only the validated solutions are posted on the platform. In 36 months, over 850 solutions developed by patients, (non-professional) caregivers or collaborators from over 60 countries were submitted, curated and shared to improve the lives of many other who struggle with different health conditions.

== Awards and Main Achievements ==
- In 2018 Patient Innovation was the winner of the Santa Casa Challenge, promoted by Santa Casa da Misericórdia de Lisboa, in the Social Action/Health category; the Fidelidade Comunidade Award; and the World Summit Awards in the category of Health and Well-Being.
- In April 2017 Católica Lisbon was one of four European business schools recognized by AACSB as Entrepreneurship Spotlight Challenge Honoree specifically for the work of Patient Innovation
- In December 2016 Patient Innovation won the Healthcare Startup Awards and was named "Non-Profit Startup of The Year” by the HealthCare Startup Society.
- Patient Innovation was one of 5 projects featured at the "Summit on Science and Technology Enablement for the Sustainable Development Goals" (November 29, 2016) as an example of "Commitments to Collective Action". This was because "Patient Innovation is already contributing to two of the UN's Sustainable Development Goals: #3- Good health and Well-Being & 9- Industry, Innovation and Infrastructure." Secretary General Ban Ki-moon (United Nations) opened the Summit.
- The London Science Museum has selected this project as one of seven case studies to be featured in the exhibition 'Beyond the Lab: The DIY Science Revolution' which opened July 7, 2016 and will visit 29 European countries until the end of 2018.
- In February 2016, Patient Innovation was one of eleven innovations from all over the world distinguished by the office of Prime Minister of the United Arab Emirates (UAE) to be featured at the 4th World Government Summit, in Dubai (February 8–10, 2016). The World Government Summit was a global event that gathered more than 3000 attendees from over 90 countries. Patient Innovation had a prominent presence in the summit, where a number of solutions were on display.
- In December 2014, Jornal i, a Portuguese newspaper, named the founder of Patient Innovation as "one of the 14 Portuguese citizens who contributed to change the world for the better"[9][10] due his work on the Patient Innovation Project.
- European Commissioner Carlos Moedas remarks about Patient Innovation:[8] "I think what you've achieved is nothing less than astonishing! The simplest innovations are the game-changers. And game-changing innovation doesn't always come easily to a sacred profession like medicine. Not many people are willing to put in the effort it takes to prove something can be done differently. Particularly, when the world around you seems to think that 'the way it's always been done' is probably good enough. So I congratulate you − I respect you immensely − for being the pro-wrestlers of change! The heavy-weights of patient innovation! I can't wait to see what the future has in store for this project and its impacts on citizens!"

== Patient Innovation Awards ==
Patient Innovation promotes the annual Patient Innovation Awards for patients, caregivers and collaborators who have developed innovative solutions to cope with the challenges of their health condition, to assist others they care about, or in some cases, to help people they don't even know. The winners of the 1st Patient Innovation Award were announced in February 2015. They are:

- Category "patients": Lisa Crites (USA) with the Shower Shirt, Louis Plante (Canada) with the Frequencer and Tal Golesworthy (United Kingdom) with the Aortic Root Support.
- Category "caregivers": Debby Elnatan (Israel) with Upsee and Joaquina Teixeira (Portugal) with the helium balloons.
- Category "collaborators": Ivan Owen (USA) and how he has helped so many patients get a 3D-printed prosthetic hand.

The 1st Patient Innovation Award Ceremony was held in Lisbon on July 13, 2015 at the Calouste Gulbenkian Foundation. European Commissioner Carlos Moedas was one of the distinguished guests.

The winners of the 2nd Patient Innovation Award were announced in February 2016. The 2nd Patient Innovation Award Ceremony was held in November 2016 during the WebSummit. They are:

- Category "patients": Michael Seres (UK), Giesbert Nijhuis (The Netherlands)
- Category "caregivers": David Day (UK, Doron Somer (Israel), Kenneth Shinozuka (US)
- Category "collaborators": Pavel Kurbtasky (Russia), Duncan Fitzsimmons (UK)

The winners of the 3rd Patient Innovation Award were announced in November 2017 at the Calouste Gulbenkian Foundation. They are:

- Category “Caregivers”: Lise Pape (Denmark) for Path Finder & Bodo Hoenen (USA) for Robotic Arm Brace
- Category “Patients”: Rita Basile (France) for Handiplat
- Category “Developing Country Innovator”: Gérard Niyondiko (Burkina Faso) for Faso Soap
- Category “Patient Innovation Lifetime Achievement Award”: Robin Cavendish (1930 - 1994) and Diana Cavendish, for developing a variety of innovations for polio patients (including a wheelchair with an attached ventilator) and for tirelessly advocating for people with disabilities.

== Research ==
The team conducts research on the role of patients of chronic diseases, and their caregivers, in creating new solutions to help them cope with their health conditions. Recently they administered a survey over phone to 500 rare disease patients/caregivers with the following objectives: to measure frequency of patient innovation in a population of rare diseases patients; to measure efforts by patients to share their solutions with others; to explore which factors drive patients to come-up with solutions and share them with others. The solutions reported by patients were validated for their novelty by two medical professionals. 40 individuals (8% of sample) reported solutions that they personally find valuable, and that are also evaluated as novel by expert medical evaluators. If anything like this fraction of innovators holds for the overall population of hundreds of millions of people worldwide estimated to be afflicted by rare diseases, patients and their caregivers may be a tremendous potential resource to improve management and care for many who are similarly afflicted.
