= REBASE (database) =

Database for DNA restriction enzymes

Content
- Description: A database for DNA restriction enzymes
- Organisms: all

Contact
- Laboratory: New England Biolabs
- Authors: Richard J Roberts
- Primary citation: PMID 19846593
- Release date: Dec 31st 2011

Access
- Website: http://rebase.neb.com
- Download URL: ftp://ftp.neb.com

Miscellaneous
- Data release frequency: Monthly
- Curation policy: Yes

In molecular biology, REBASE is a database of information about restriction enzymes and DNA methyltransferases. REBASE contains an extensive set of references, sites of recognition and cleavage, sequences and structures. It also contains information on the commercial availability of each enzyme. REBASE is one of the longest running biological databases having its roots in a collection of restriction enzymes maintained by Richard J. Roberts since before 1980. Since that time there have been regular descriptions of the resource in the journal Nucleic Acids Research.

== See also ==
- Restriction enzymes
- DNA methyltransferases
