= New England Biolabs =

American life sciences company

New England Biolabs, Inc.
- Founded: 1974; 52 years ago
- Founder: Donald Comb
- Headquarters: 240 County Road, Ipswich, Massachusetts 01938
- Key people: Salvatore Russello, CEO
- Number of employees: 501-1000
- Subsidiaries: Australia; Canada; China; France; Germany; Japan; Korea; Singapore; United Kingdom
- Website: www.neb.com

New England Biolabs, Inc. (NEB) is an American life sciences company which produces and supplies recombinant and native enzyme reagents for life science research. It also provides products and services supporting genome editing, synthetic biology and next-generation sequencing. NEB also provides free access to research tools such as REBASE, InBASE, and Polbase.

== About ==
The company was founded in 1974 by Donald "Don" Comb, a Harvard Medical School professor, as a cooperative laboratory of experienced scientists and initially produced restriction enzymes on a commercial scale. Comb held the CEO title until 2005 when, at 78 years old, he moved from management back into research at the firm.

NEB received approximately $1.7 million in Small Business Innovation Research (SBIR) grants between 2009 and 2013 for this research.

NEB produces 230 recombinant and 30 native restriction enzymes for genomic research, as well as nicking enzymes and DNA methylases. It pursues research in areas related to proteomics, DNA Sequencing, and drug discovery. NEB scientists also conduct basic research in Molecular Biology and Parasitology.

The company has subsidiaries in Singapore, Canada, China, France, Germany, Japan, the U.K., and Australia, and distributors in South America, Australia, and other countries in Europe and Asia. Its headquarters are in Ipswich, MA. Development of the current headquarters began in 2000, and was completed in 2005. Donald Comb served as the company's Chairman and CEO from the company's founding in 1974, until 2005. In 2005, he was replaced as chief executive by James Ellard, though Comb continued to serve as chairman of the board of directors. In October 2020 Comb died at the age of 93. NEB employs over 450 people at its headquarters. As company policy, all scientists and some executives must work at least one day per month on the customer support telephone line, answering technical support questions about the company's products. In 2022 Jim Ellard stepped down as CEO, but remained chairman of the board of directors, he was succeeded by Salvatore (Sal) Russello, previously NEB's director of OEM & customized solutions.

Sir Richard John Roberts is the company's chief scientific officer. He shared the 1993 Nobel Prize in Physiology or Medicine with Phillip Allen Sharp for the discovery of introns in eukaryotic DNA and the mechanism of gene-splicing.

In 2015, NEB committed to establishing a GMP manufacturing facility near its headquarters in Ipswich, Massachusetts, and the 40,000-sq-ft facility was completed in 2018. The multi-product Rowley Cleanroom Manufacturing Facility makes GMP-grade products and has a 10,000-sq-ft mechanical mezzanine.

== Applications and Tools ==
=== Luna kits ===
In January 2017, NEB released Luna universal quantitative real-time polymerase chain reaction (qPCR) and reverse-transcription quantitative polymerase chain reaction (RT-qPCR) kits. The Luna kits are used for DNA or RNA quantitation.

=== NEBNext products ===
In December 2017, the company released the NEBNext Ultra II FS DNA library prep kit for next-generation sequencing (NGS). In October 2019, NEB released a new RNA depletion product, the NEBNext Globin & rRNA Depletion Kit (Human/Mouse/Rat) and NEBNext rRNA Depletion Kit (Bacteria). The kits offer specific depletion of the RNA species that interfere with the analysis of coding and non-coding RNAs. That same month, the company announced its NEBNext Direct Genotyping Solution. The product delivers a one-day, automatable genotyping workflow for a variety of applications in Agricultural biotechnology.

In January 2020, NEB signed an agreement with ERS Genomics Limited that gave NEB rights to sell CRISPR/Cas9 tools and reagents, used for gene editing.

=== Cloning and synthetic biology ===
The NEBuilder HiFi DNA Assembly Cloning Kit and Master Mix enable one-step cloning and multiple DNA fragment assembly. The proprietary DNA polymerase in the NEBuilder HiFi enzyme mix can assemble DNA fragments ranging from 100 bp to 19 kb. NEB also offers the Gibson Assembly Master Mix.

=== Monarch nucleic acid purification ===
NEB provides purification kits for both DNA and RNA. In May 2019, NEB released the Monarch Genomic DNA Purification Kit which is designed to minimize RNA contamination and allow high-yield purification of large DNA fragments. NEB's nucleic acid purification products have been used in various studies, including:

- Purification of genomic DNA used to discover naturally occurring DNA modifications in bacteriophages.
- Purification of RNA from wound biopsies to study the relationship between genetics, wound microbiome diversity, and wound healing.
- Purification of genomic DNA from squid embryos used in the first gene knockout in a cephalopod.
- Purification of RNA from mouse samples in a study identifying a pathway that selectively regulates cancer stem cells, which may be responsible for treatment resistance, tumor metastasis, and disease recurrence.
- Purification of total RNA from Arabidopsis seedlings in a study demonstrating the first known response by a biological receptor to radio frequency exposure.

== Response to COVID-19 ==
New England Biolabs developed a colorimetric loop-mediated isothermal amplification (LAMP) assay for research use. This assay can be used to test for the presence of virus through nucleic acid detection, returning results in only 30 minutes. In 2020, the LAMP method was one of several molecular tests used to detect RNA from SARS-CoV-2, a strain of coronavirus that causes COVID-19.

RNA isolation kits were also used to develop assays to detect SARS-CoV-2. NEB's Monarch Total RNA Miniprep Kit was not designed specifically for viral RNA extraction, but it was successfully used by different companies to extract viral RNA from biological samples. NEB also released a supplementary protocol for processing saliva, buccal swabs, and nasopharyngeal samples.

Three next-generation sequencing kits to support SARS-CoV-2 monitoring were launched in February, 2021. These kits, based on ARTIC Network protocols, provide virus transmission and evolution insights.

In April, 2021, the Color SARS-CoV-2 RT-LAMP Diagnostic Assay, utilizing New England Biolabs reagents, was approved for emergency use at Color Health Inc in Burlingame, California.

== Databases ==
The company runs free scientific databases. REBASE, the restriction enzyme database, contains the details of commercial and research endonucleases. In 2011 the company founded Polbase, an online database which provides information specifically about polymerases. Another free NEB database is InBase, an intein database, which includes the Intein Registry and information about each intein.

== Partnerships ==
In 2001, NEB co-founded the marine DNA library Ocean Genome Legacy (OGL), which according to the Boston Globe, "catalogues samples of organisms from all over the world, to be made available to scientists for research". Though originally located on the NEB campus, OGLF relocated to the Nahant campus of Northeastern University in 2014. To enable point-of-use sales of its reagents, NEB created a digital interface for enzyme-housing freezers to be used at customer storage sites, through a partnership with Ionia Corp. and Salesforce.com. The data is used by the company for both sales logistics and as a part of future enzyme research development. It has also partnered with Harvard University on recycling and reclamation initiatives when its products and packaging come to the end of their use or lifecycle. As of 2015, NEB also had a distribution agreement with VWR.

In June 2019, NEB, Waters, and Genos announced they would work together on The Human Glycome Project, a global initiative to map the structure and function of human glycans. NEB will supply a version of its Rapid PNGase F technology to aid in increased sample preparation and improve process throughput.

That same month, NEB entered a partnership with Bioz, Inc., an artificial intelligence technology company, to provide its customers with access to examples of real-world applications of its products.
