= Fair Use Project =

The Fair Use Project is part of the Stanford Center for Internet and Society at Stanford Law School. Founded in 2006, it offers legal assistance to "clarify, and extend, the boundaries of "fair use" in order to enhance creative freedom." It is headed by Tony Falzone, lecturer at Stanford Law. It has been involved in several notable cases such as Aguiar v. Webb, Brave New Films v. Viacom, Golan v. Gonzales, Kahle v. Gonzales, Lennon v. Premise Media, Warner Brothers and JK Rowling v. RDR Books, Shloss v. Joyce, and Vargas v. BT.
