= Warner Bros. Entertainment Inc. v. RDR Books =

2007 copyright lawsuit

Warner Bros. Entertainment, Inc. and J. K. Rowling v. RDR Books, 575 F.Supp.2d 513 (SDNY 2008) was a copyright lawsuit brought on 31 October 2007 by the media company Warner Bros. and Harry Potter author J. K. Rowling against RDR Books, an independent publishing company based in Muskegon, Michigan. Lawyers for Rowling and Time Warner argued that RDR's attempt to publish for profit a print facsimile of The Harry Potter Lexicon, a free online guide to the Harry Potter fictional universe, constituted an infringement of their copyright and was not protected by the affirmative defense of fair use. The trial was held from 14–17 April 2008 in the United States District Court for the Southern District of New York. In September 2008, the court ruled in Rowling's favor, and publication of the book was blocked. In 2009, RDR Books released an edited volume, eliminating the problematic long quotes found to be infringing.

== Origins ==
In 2000, Steve Vander Ark, a librarian from Grand Rapids, Michigan, created the Harry Potter Lexicon, an online encyclopedia of the Harry Potter book series that collected and reorganized various facts from the novels into a searchable form. The Lexicon, which is non-profit, with only its operations paid for by advertising, quickly became a favorite for fans of the books, including Rowling herself, who claimed on her website that "I have been known to sneak into an internet cafe while out writing and check a fact rather than go into a bookshop and buy a copy of Harry Potter, which is embarrassing."

In August 2007, Vander Ark was contacted by Roger Rapoport, President of RDR Books, and asked about the possibility of publishing a for-profit print version of the site. Although Vander Ark had previously claimed he had no interest in doing so, Rapoport assured Vander Ark that such a publication would be legal. To further pacify Vander Ark's concerns, he added an addendum to the contract that stated that RDR Books would act to defend him in any future lawsuits.

== Pre-trial ==
On 31 October 2007, Warner Bros. and Rowling sued RDR Books to block the book's publication. Rowling, who previously had a good relationship with Vander Ark, reiterated on her website that she plans to write a Harry Potter encyclopedia, and that the publication of a similar book before her own would hurt the proceeds of the official encyclopedia, which she plans to give to charity. A judge later barred publication of the book in any form until the case was resolved. In their suit, Rowling's lawyers also asserted that, as the book describes itself as a print facsimile of the Harry Potter Lexicon website, it would publish excerpts from the novels and stills from the films without offering sufficient "transformative" material to be considered a separate work.

On her website, Rowling said, "Despite repeated requests, the publishers have refused to even countenance making any changes to the book to ensure that it does not infringe my rights." On his website, Vander Ark responded,

I have worked diligently with everyone associated with the books to make sure we don't violate copyright. There have been a number of times when I have talked with Jo's people and held back information they didn't want published or modified material on the Lexicon to make sure they approve. I got specific permission from Warner Bros. to use film images and the illustrations from the books. I have been just as diligent with the rights of fans who have allowed me to use their writing and artwork. In each case I have listed the copyright owner and made sure that they were credited and that they retained their copyright.

"There have been a huge number of companion books that have been published", said Neil Blair of Rowling's literary agency, Christopher Little, "Ninety-nine percent have come to speak to us. In every case they have made changes to ensure compliance. They fall in line. But these guys refused to contact us. They refused to answer any questions. They refused to show us any details."

RDR Books retained Lizbeth Hasse, from the Creative Industry Law Group in San Francisco, who recommended that RDR Books also retain a New York trial attorney, David Hammer. Ms. Hasse then asked a group of intellectual property lawyers at Stanford Law School to help defend RDR Books' right to publish. Fair Use Project Executive Director Anthony Falzone said the Lexicon is protected by U.S. law which has long given people "the right to create reference guides that discuss literary works, comment on them and make them more accessible."

On 16 January 2008, Rowling and Warner Bros. filed their full 1,100 page complaint against RDR Books, claiming that the book

compiles and repackages Ms. Rowling's fictional facts derived wholesale from the Harry Potter works without adding any new creativity, commentary, insight, or criticism. Defendant's attempt to cloak the Infringing Book in the mantle of scholarship is merely a ruse designed to circumvent Plaintiffs' rights in order to make a quick buck.

On 25 January 2008, RDR submitted a request to Judge Robert Patterson, United States District Court that Rowling and her publishers hand over to them all potential source material for the planned encyclopaedia, including, "The notes that JKR has made on the seven novels ... Cheryl Klein's [the novels' continuity editor] full index ... Bloomsbury's 'comprehensive bible'" and "The 'further material from Ms. Rowling's creative mind'". Patterson refused, but did grant "statements contained in the publications listed in the plaintiffs' response" to Warner Bros. claims.

In February 2008, Vander Ark, in an interview with the British fan magazine Ansible, said

The book is not simply a cut and paste of the Lexicon website. The entries on the website provide much more detailed and complete information than the entries in the book. We took the information on the site and did a lot of editing, condensing, and in some cases complete rewriting. We avoided direct quotations whenever we could and clearly cited any quotations that we kept in. In the case of entries from Rowling's own "encyclopedia"-style books, we intentionally left a lot out and urged readers in the introduction to the book to go buy her books for the complete information ... While I was working on the Lexicon book, I received assurances from several copyright and intellectual property experts that the book we were creating was legal.

Vander Ark dismissed Rowling's claim to copyright:

Part of the problem all along has been the automatic assumption on the part of many that Rowling has the right to completely control anything written about the Harry Potter world. That's quite a huge power grab on her part and from everything I can tell, not legal. You and I are part of a subculture that lives off the creative work of others. We always try to do that in a legal and respectful way. However, if Rowling manages to extend her reach that far into our subculture, she will choke us off very quickly. And if she doesn't, what's to stop the next person from taking this legal precedent to even more dangerous places?

On 8 February 2008, RDR Books published their official memorandum in response to Warner Bros injunction, saying, in part, "[Rowling] appears to claim a monopoly on the right to publish literary reference guides, and other non-academic research, relating to her own fiction. This is a right no court has ever recognized. It has little to recommend it. If accepted, it would dramatically extend the reach of copyright protection, and eliminate an entire genre of literary supplements."

Rowling and Warner Bros. responded on 27 February, saying, "The book consists of 400 pages of material taken from the series. Its 2437 entries use the series' fictional facts, long plot summaries and paraphrased character descriptions, all of which is actionable," and that, "RDR's argument that the book is "transformative" is wrong because ... the book does not create "new information, new aesthetics, new insights and understandings." The statement also claimed that Warner Bros "have shown that the book is devoid of analysis, commentary or anything else rising to the level of scholarship," and that, "Of the book's 2437 entries, 2034 simply lift information straight from the series."

Rowling supported the injunction, saying, "I am particularly concerned about RDR's continued insistence that my acceptance of free fan based websites somehow justifies its efforts to publish an unauthorized Harry Potter "lexicon" directly contrary to my stated intention to publish my own definitive Harry Potter Encyclopedia," and that, "RDR's position [that fans could simply buy both books] is presumptuous because it assumes that everyone would want to have two Harry Potter encyclopedias and insensitive in thinking that everyone who would want to have both could afford to purchase both." She concluded by saying,

I am very frustrated that a former fan has tried to co-opt my work for financial gain. The Harry Potter books are full of moral choices and ethical dilemmas, and, ironically, Mr. Vander Ark's actions tend to demonstrate that he is woefully unfit to represent himself as either a "fan of" or "expert on" books whose spirit he seems entirely to have missed.

== Trial ==
The trial began on 14 April 2008 in the United States District Court for the Southern District of New York, with Rowling testifying on day one and Vander Ark testifying on day two. During her testimony, Rowling reiterated her claim that the Lexicon contained minimal commentary and merely recycled her writing, adding nothing other than "facetious asides and etymologies of the easiest kind." Rowling referred to the Lexicon as "wholesale theft of 17 years of my hard work", and criticized it as "sloppy" and characterized by "very little research". In sometimes emotional testimony, Rowling recalled beginning the Potter books when she was an impoverished 25-year-old single mother, nearly coming to tears when saying, "These characters continue to mean so much to me over a long period of time. The closest you could come is to say, 'How do you feel about your children?'" Rowling also revealed that the lawsuit has "decimated her creative work" over the prior month, causing her to cease work on a new novel. In his testimony, Vander Ark said that he too had had reservations about publishing the encyclopedia and that the publishing company had talked him into it. "It's been difficult because there has been a lot of criticism, obviously, and that was never the intention. ... This has been an important part of my life for the last nine years or so," he said.

Wary of the consequences of a legal ruling, the presiding judge, Robert P. Patterson, Jr., urged the parties to settle, saying,

I'm concerned that this case is more lawyer-driven than it is client-driven. The fair use people are on one side, and a large company is on the other side. . . . The parties ought to see if there's not a way to work this out, because there are strong issues in this case and it could come out one way or the other. The fair use doctrine is not clear.

The plaintiffs made their closing remarks on the third day of the trial. Rowling claimed that "This case is about an author's right to protect their creation. If this book is allowed to be published the floodgates will open. Are we, or are we not, the owners of our own work? It's not just my work that is endangered." In addition, she claimed that the Lexicon was "sloppy, lazy" and "filled with errors," though RDR Books lawyer Anthony Falzone noted that "Copyright law does not permit an author to suppress a book because she doesn't like it."

On day three, the two sides reached a limited settlement involving the use of any Rowling endorsements on the book. It was agreed that, should it be published, neither her name nor her previous endorsement of the website would be used to promote it.

Each side employed a literary expert to testify whether or not the Lexicon had copied text without attribution. RDR hired a literature professor from the University of California, Berkeley, who cited reference guides to The Lord of the Rings and C.S. Lewis's The Chronicles of Narnia as precedents to the Lexicon's book. David Hammer, lawyer for RDR, claimed that the need for a reference guide was greatest when the work being discussed is most creative, and fantasy is presumably the most creative form of literature.

Ms. Jeri Johnson, senior tutor in English at Exeter College, Oxford, spoke as an expert witness in literature for the plaintiffs, decrying Vander Ark's work as unscholarly, and claiming that there was enough material in Rowling's world for serious academic analysis. Rowling's lawyers said that, unlike those guides, the Lexicon consists largely of information taken from the books and contains little interpretation or analysis. RDR's lawyers agreed, but said that such guides can provide other benefits for the reader than analysis.

During the trial, Rowling said on the stand, "I never ever once wanted to stop Mr. Vander Ark from doing his own guide, never ever. Do your book, but, please, change it so it does not take as much of my work." However, in an interview with the Chicago Tribune, RDR Books' publisher, Roger Rappaport, said, "That opportunity was never presented to us. The only thing they said was: 'Will you stop the book?'"

== Verdict ==
On 8 September 2008, Judge Patterson decided the case in Rowling's favor, claiming that "because the Lexicon appropriates too much of Rowling's creative work for its purposes as a reference guide, a permanent injunction must issue to prevent the possible proliferation of works that do the same and thus deplete the incentive for original authors to create new works." Patterson awarded the plaintiffs $750 for infringement of each of the seven Harry Potter novels and $750 for infringement of each of two official companion books (i.e., Quidditch Through the Ages and Fantastic Beasts and Where to Find Them); the minimum amount possible, "since the Lexicon has not been published and thus plaintiffs have suffered no harm beyond the fact of the infringement." Patterson was careful to draw a distinction between the Lexicon book and other potential guidebooks, saying, "While the Lexicon, in its current state, is not a fair use of the Harry Potter works, reference works that share the Lexicon's purpose of aiding readers of literature generally should be encouraged rather than stifled".

Patterson concluded that, "Because it serves ... reference purposes, rather than the entertainment or aesthetic purposes of the original works, the Lexicon's use is transformative and does not supplant the objects of the Harry Potter works." However, he also noted that, "The Lexicon's use of Rowling's companion books is transformative to a much lesser extent. The content of the companion books takes on the informational purpose of the schoolbooks they represent in the novels. As Vander Ark testified, the companion books are 'essentially encyclopedias already'."

"The transformative character of the Lexicon is diminished, however, because the Lexicon's use of the original Harry Potter works is not consistently transformative," Patterson ruled. "The Lexicon's verbatim copying of ... highly aesthetic expression raises a significant question as to whether it was reasonably necessary for the purpose of creating a useful and complete reference guide."

Patterson rejected Rowling's argument that the book interfered with her plans to write a Harry Potter encyclopedia, saying, "the market for reference guides to the Harry Potter works is not exclusively hers to exploit or license, no matter the commercial success attributable to the popularity of the original works."

== Reaction ==
In a statement released to the media, Rowling responded favorably to the verdict:

I took no pleasure at all in bringing legal action and am delighted that this issue has been resolved favorably. I went to court to uphold the right of authors everywhere to protect their own original work. The court has upheld that right. The proposed book took an enormous amount of my work and added virtually no original commentary of its own. Many books have been published which offer original insights into the world of Harry Potter. The Lexicon just is not one of them.

The Stanford Law School fair use project, which had represented RDR, said,

We are encouraged by the fact that the Court recognized that as a general matter authors do not have the right to stop the publication of reference guides and companion books about literary works. As for the Lexicon, we are obviously disappointed with the result, and RDR Books is considering all of its options, including an appeal.

On their website, the group clarified their position:

In a thoughtful and meticulous decision spanning 68 pages, the Court recognized that as a general matter authors do not have the right to stop publication of reference guides and companion books about literary works, and issued an important explanation of why reference guides are not derivative works. Needless to say, we're very happy the Court vindicated these important principles ... The Court held the Lexicon infringed Ms. Rowling's copyright, was not protected by fair use, and permanently enjoined the publication of it. ... Careful and thoughtful as the decision is, we think it's wrong. So stay tuned to see where we go from here.

David Hammer, the lawyer who represented RDR Books, said, "I'm sorry about the result, that the lexicon was not found to be sufficiently transformative, but I am happy the judge endorsed the genre of reference works and companion books as valuable and important and that authors don't have an automatic right to control what's written about their works."

In an interview with the Grand Rapids Press, Vander Ark commented, "I've always been a fan of Harry Potter and of Rowling and my hope all along was that we'd find an amicable way to settle this," Vander Ark said from England this on Tuesday morning. "I'm disappointed, but this is the way it went and I don't hold any ill will at all. It was a question of law over a difference of opinion and, in a way, I'm glad that it's finally over." He is currently creating a new version of the Lexicon and writing a Harry Potter-themed travel memoir, relating his experiences of visiting various locations mentioned in the Harry Potter books.

Novelist Joanna Trollope commented in The Times that,

This is not a matter of that age-old - and impossible - difficulty of the plagiarism of ideas. It is something much easier to define, and a danger to all writers. It is - let's not mince our words - the theft of someone's writing, someone's own words stolen in exactly the form in which their brain produced them. And it's a theft to which all writers are vulnerable. Jo Rowling didn't have to do this. I should think that her time in New York was horrible, exacerbated by a lack of support caused, no doubt, by deeply unattractive sourness over her wealth. Well, I applaud her, and I bet I'm not alone. I am thrilled for her, and very grateful to her, for taking the stand she did - and winning.

== Appeal ==
Vander Ark and Rapoport considered appealing the decision, and said that the book could be edited until it complies with the ruling. Patterson said he expected this case could go as far as the Supreme Court. In December 2008, RDR Books dropped its appeal, and instead decided to release another unauthorized Harry Potter guide (The Lexicon: An Unauthorized Guide to Harry Potter Fiction and Related Materials), which would include far more commentary than the original. The book was released on January 16, 2009.

== Implications ==
An analysis by Jonathan Band for the Association of Research Libraries (ARL) and the American Library Association (ALA) contends that "the big winner actually was fair use." Band found a number of "pro–fair-use holdings" and concluded that the decision "provides a clear roadmap for how to avoid infringement claims when creating" reference guides to literary works, even when the guides do not contain scholarly criticism or analysis.

Matthew Rimmer, an Australian law expert, commented that the ruling,

is an important precedent in respect of the defense of fair use and it represents a victory of authorial rights over the freedoms of secondary users of copyright works ... The case leaves the way open for future conflict over derivative works, character merchandising and fan fiction based upon the Harry Potter series.

David Ardia of the Citizen Media Law Project opined that,

there is some good news in the opinion for fair use advocates. First, the court concluded that reference guides such as the Lexicon are transformative in character and in order to fulfill their purpose they must be able to "make considerable use of the original works ... Second, reference works don't lose their transformative nature just because they lack analysis or commentary. The court rejected Rowling's argument that the Lexicon is not transformative because it fails to add these elements ... Third, copyright holders cannot exert exclusive control over the market for reference works. According to Judge Patterson, even a copyright holder as eager as Rowling is to control through licensing all related markets must face limits.

== See also ==
- Legal disputes over the Harry Potter series
