= Maria do Carmo Seabra =

Portuguese politician

Maria do Carmo Seabra (born 27 January 1955) is a Portuguese politician.

Born in Lisbon, she served as Minister of Education in the 2004–2005 government of fellow Social Democrat Pedro Santana Lopes.

She is currently a lecturer of Principles of Microeconomics at Nova School of Business and Economics.
