= Population epigenetics =

Population epigenetics is a field that examines the extent (degree of variation) and dynamics (change over time) of epigenetic variation in natural populations, especially in response to changing environmental conditions. This emerging discipline integrates concepts from population genetics, epigenetics, and ecology to explore how epigenetic modifications, such as DNA methylation, contribute to phenotypic diversity and adaptation in wild populations. Unlike traditional population genetics, which focuses on variations in DNA sequences, population epigenetics studies heritable changes in gene expression that occur without alterations to the DNA sequence itself.

Since epigenetic changes can be influenced by environmental factors, have a potentially higher rate of spontaneous mutation than genetic sequences, and may be passed down through non-Mendelian inheritance, they play a significant role in adaptation. Population epigenetics therefore offers new insights into the mechanisms of evolution, disease susceptibility, and the ability of organisms to adapt to changing environments.
