= Pubmeth =

Content
- Description: DNA hypermethylation data (cancer)

Contact
- Laboratory: Laboratory for Bioinformatics and Computational Genomics; Ghent University
- Primary citation: PMID 17932060

Access
- Website: http://www.pubmeth.org/ (Site was created in 2007, but inaccessible in 2026)

PubMeth is a database that contains information about DNA hypermethylation in cancer. It can be queried either by searching a list of genes, or cancer (sub)types. It was created at the Laboratory for Bioinformatics and Computational Genomics in the Department of Molecular Biotechnology at Ghent University, Belgium. It was published in Nucleic Acids Research.

A comparable database is MethDB. However, it is not optimized to cancer-related queries. Another database is MethPrimerDB which focuses on detection methodologies such as Methylation-specific primer design (MSP primer design). However, according the research published in the original article about PubMeth:

Both databases discussed here, depend on submissions by administrators or users, which guarantees the required quality of the databases, but consequently they are not always complete and up to date. The databases are neither designed to rank and summarize cancer-related information [genes and cancer (sub)types involved], although this is crucial in applied methylation research in the cancer field.
