= Richard J. Roberts =

British biochemist (born 1943)

Sir Richard J. Roberts FRS
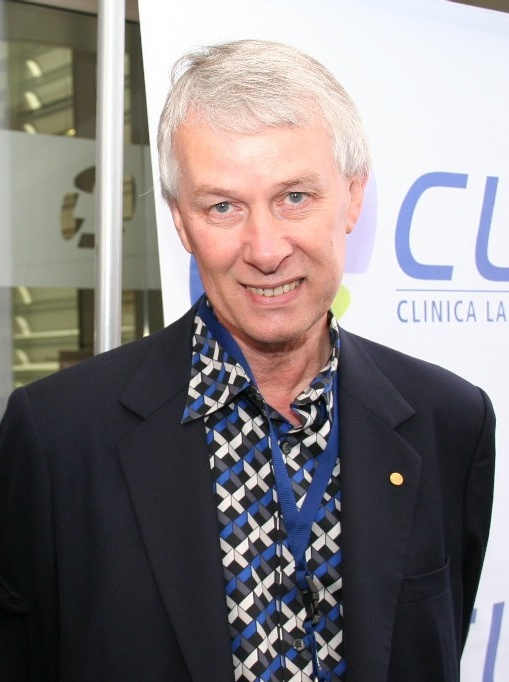
- Roberts in 2007
- Born: Richard John Roberts; 6 September 1943 (age 83); Derby, England
- Education: University of Sheffield (BSc, PhD)
- Known for: Alternative splicing; Work on introns; Restriction endonucleases; DNA methylation; Computational molecular biology
- Awards: Nobel Prize in Physiology or Medicine (1993); Knight Bachelor (2008); Lomonosov Gold Medal (2021)
- Scientific career
- Fields: Molecular biology
- Workplaces: University of Sheffield; New England Biolabs; Cold Spring Harbor Laboratory; Harvard University
- Thesis: Phytochemical studies involving neoflavanoids and isoflavanoids (1969)
- Website: nobelprize.org/nobel_prizes/medicine/laureates/1993/roberts-bio.html

Sir Richard John Roberts (born 6 September 1943) is a British biochemist and molecular biologist. He was awarded the 1993 Nobel Prize in Physiology or Medicine with Phillip Allen Sharp for the discovery of introns in eukaryotic DNA and the mechanism of gene-splicing. He currently works at New England Biolabs.

== Early life and education ==
Roberts was born in Derby, the son of Edna (Allsop) and John Roberts, an auto mechanic. When he was four, Roberts' family moved to Bath. In Bath, he attended City of Bath Boys' School. As a child he at first wanted to be a detective and then, when given a chemistry set, a chemist. In 1965 he graduated from the University of Sheffield with a Bachelor of Science degree in chemistry followed by a PhD in 1969. His thesis involved phytochemical studies of neoflavonoids and isoflavonoids.

== Career and research ==
During 1969–1972, he did postdoctoral research at Harvard University. before moving to Cold Spring Harbor Laboratory, where he was hired by James Dewey Watson, a co-discoverer of the structure of DNA and a fellow Nobel laureate. In this period he also visited the MRC Laboratory of Molecular Biology for the first time, working alongside Fred Sanger. In 1977, he published his discovery of RNA splicing. In 1992, he moved to New England Biolabs. The following year, he shared a Nobel Prize with his former colleague at Cold Spring Harbor Phillip Allen Sharp.

Roberts's discovery of the alternative splicing of genes, in particular, has had a profound impact on the study and applications of molecular biology. The realisation that individual genes could exist as separate, disconnected segments within longer strands of DNA first arose in his 1977 study of adenovirus, one of the viruses responsible for causing the common cold. Robert's research in this field resulted in a fundamental shift in our understanding of genetics, and has led to the discovery of split genes in higher organisms, including human beings.

== Awards and honours ==
In 1992, Roberts received an honorary doctorate from the Faculty of Medicine at Uppsala University, Sweden. After becoming a Nobel laureate in 1993 he was awarded an Honorary Degree (Doctor of Science) by the University of Bath in 1994. Roberts also received the Golden Plate Award of the American Academy of Achievement in 1994. In 2021 he was awarded the Lomonosov Gold Medal of the Russian Academy of Sciences. In 2025, he became an honorary member of the academic staff of D'Annunzio University of Chieti–Pescara, Italy.

Roberts was elected a Fellow of the Royal Society (FRS) in 1995 and a member of the European Molecular Biology Organization (EMBO) in the same year. In 2005, a multimillion-pound expansion to the chemistry department at the University of Sheffield, where he had been a student, was named after him. A refurbished science department at Beechen Cliff School (previously City of Bath Boys' School) was also named after Roberts, who had donated a substantial sum of his Nobel prize winnings to the school.

Roberts is an atheist and was one of the signers of the Humanist Manifesto. He was knighted in the 2008 Birthday Honours.

Roberts is a member of the Advisory Board of Patient Innovation, a nonprofit, international, multilingual, free venue for patients and caregivers of any disease to share their innovations.

Roberts has been a keynote speaker at the Congress of Future Medical Leaders (2014, 2015, 2016, 2020).

He also is the chairman of The Laureate Science Alliance, a non-profit supporting research worldwide.

In 2016, Roberts and other Nobelists composed and signed a "Laureates Letter Supporting Precision Agriculture (GMOs)" addressed to the leaders of Greenpeace, the United Nations and global governments and Sir Roberts has advocated for Genetically Modified Organisms (GMOs) in general and Golden Rice in particular to advance health in developing countries, noting the high safety record of GM foods.
