= Genome editing =

Type of genetic engineering

The different generations of restriction endonucleases used for genome editing and the DNA repair pathways used to modify target DNA.

Genome editing, or genome engineering, or gene editing, is a type of genetic engineering in which DNA is inserted, deleted, modified or replaced in the genome of a living organism. Unlike early genetic engineering techniques that randomly insert genetic material into a host genome, genome editing targets the insertions to site-specific locations.

Programmable molecules called restriction endonucleases, also known as gene editors or molecular scissors, are used to create double-strand breaks (DSBs) at desired locations in the genome. The induced breaks are repaired through homology-directed recombination (HDR) or non-homologous end joining (NHEJ), resulting in targeted mutations.

The development of CRISPR gene editing in 2015 improved the efficiency, specificity, and practicality of large-scale genome editing.

One of the earliest and most efficient methods of geonome editing is base editing. It does not require breaking and recombining the genomic DNA strands, and thus avoids the random insertions and deletions associated with these procedures. However, it is only appropriate for precise editing of single nucleotides. It employs nucleobase modifying enzymes directed by nucleic acid guide sequences. It was first described in the 1990s and has seen a resurgence more recently.

Since 2015, genome editing has been experimentally investigated on non-viable human embryos. In 2019, the first humans were born from genome-edited embryos using the CRISPR technique, as a result of the controversial He Jiankui affair.

== History ==
Genome editing was pioneered in the 1990s, before the advent of the common current nuclease-based gene-editing platforms, but its use was limited by low efficiencies of editing.

In the 2000s, genome editing with engineered nucleases (also known as "molecular scissors") was introduced. As of 2011, three families of engineered nucleases were used: meganucleases, zinc finger nucleases (ZFNs), transcription activator-like effector-based nucleases (TALEN). All of them were selected by Nature Methods as the 2011 Method of the Year. In 2015 the CRISPR-Cas system was introduced, and it was selected by Science as 2015 Breakthrough of the Year. Nine genome editors were available as of 2017.

In 2018, the common methods for such editing used engineered nucleases to create double-strand breaks (DSBs) at desired locations in the genome. The induced double-strand breaks are repaired through nonhomologous end-joining (NHEJ) or homologous recombination (HR), resulting in targeted mutations ('edits').

In May 2019, lawyers in China reported, in light of the purported creation by Chinese scientist He Jiankui of the first gene-edited humans (see Lulu and Nana controversy), the drafting of regulations that anyone manipulating the human genome by gene-editing techniques, like CRISPR, would be held responsible for any related adverse consequences. A cautionary perspective on the possible blind spots and risks of CRISPR and related biotechnologies has been recently discussed, focusing on the stochastic nature of cellular control processes.

The University of Edinburgh Roslin Institute engineered pigs resistant to a virus that causes porcine reproductive and respiratory syndrome, which costs US and European pig farmers $2.6 billion annually.

In February 2020, a US trial safely showed CRISPR gene editing on 3 cancer patients. In 2020 Sicilian Rouge High GABA, a tomato that makes more of an amino acid said to promote relaxation, was approved for sale in Japan.

In 2021, England (not the rest of the UK) planned to remove restrictions on gene-edited plants and animals, moving from European Union-compliant regulation to rules closer to those of the US and some other countries. An April 2021 European Commission report found "strong indications" that the current regulatory regime was not appropriate for gene editing. Later in 2021, researchers announced a CRISPR alternative, labelled obligate mobile element–guided activity (OMEGA) proteins including IscB, IsrB and TnpB as endonucleases found in transposons, and guided by small ωRNAs.

In 2026, Zilong Qiu and his team at the Shanghai Jiao Tong University School of Medicine, published successful use of base editing in mice and monkeys to induce corrected CHD3 gene that causes Snijders Blok–Campeau syndrome. It was subsequently discovered that a year before, Qiu had treated a six-year-old girl at Xinhua Hospital in Shanghai using engineered viruses to carry the corrected gene into the spinal fluid. The girl died of thrombotic microangiopathy several days later.

== Background ==
Genetic engineering, as method of introducing new genetic elements into organisms, has been around since the 1970s. One drawback of this technology has been the random nature with which the DNA is inserted into the host's genome, which can impair or alter other genes within the organism. However, several methods have been discovered that target the inserted genes to specific sites within an organism's genome. It has also enabled the editing of specific sequences within a genome, as well as reduced off-target effects. This could be used for research purposes, by targeting mutations to specific genes, and in gene therapy. By inserting a functional gene into an organism, and targeting it to replace the defective one, it could be possible to cure certain genetic diseases.

=== Gene targeting ===
==== Homologous recombination ====
Early methods to target genes to certain sites within a genome of an organism (called gene targeting) relied on homologous recombination (HR). By creating DNA constructs that contain a template that matches the targeted genome sequence, it is possible that the HR processes within the cell will insert the construct at the desired location. Using this method on embryonic stem cells led to the development of transgenic mice with targeted genes knocked out. It has also been possible to knock in genes or alter gene expression patterns. In recognition of their discovery of how homologous recombination can be used to introduce genetic modifications in mice through embryonic stem cells, Mario Capecchi, Martin Evans and Oliver Smithies were awarded the 2007 Nobel Prize for Physiology or Medicine.

==== Conditional targeting ====
If a vital gene is knocked out, it can prove lethal to the organism. In order to study the function of these genes, site specific recombinases (SSR) were used. The two most common types are the Cre-LoxP and Flp-FRT systems. Cre recombinase is an enzyme that removes DNA by homologous recombination between binding sequences known as Lox-P sites. The Flip-FRT system operates in a similar way, with the Flip recombinase recognising FRT sequences. By crossing an organism containing the recombinase sites flanking the gene of interest with an organism that express the SSR under control of tissue specific promoters, it is possible to knock out or switch on genes only in certain cells. These techniques were also used to remove marker genes from transgenic animals. Further modifications of these systems allowed researchers to induce recombination only under certain conditions, allowing genes to be knocked out or expressed at desired times or stages of development.

== Process ==
=== Double strand break repair ===
dsDNA-break repair pathways and genome editing using CRISPR-Cas nucleases

A common form of genome editing relies on the concept of DNA double stranded break (DSB) repair mechanics. There are two major pathways that repair DSB; non-homologous end joining (NHEJ) and homology directed repair (HDR). NHEJ uses a variety of enzymes to directly join the DNA ends, while the more accurate HDR uses a homologous sequence as a template for regeneration of missing DNA sequences at the break point. This can be exploited by creating a vector with the desired genetic elements within a sequence that is homologous to the flanking sequences of a DSB. This will result in the desired change being inserted at the site of the DSB. While HDR based gene editing is similar to the homologous recombination based gene targeting, the rate of recombination is increased by at least three orders of magnitude.

=== Engineered nucleases ===
Groups of engineered nucleases. Matching colors signify DNA recognition patterns

The key to genome editing is creating a DSB at a specific point within the genome. Commonly used restriction enzymes are effective at cutting DNA, but generally recognize and cut at multiple sites. To overcome this challenge and create site-specific DSB, four distinct classes of nucleases have been discovered and bioengineered to date:

- Meganucleases
- Zinc finger nucleases (ZFNs)
- Transcription-activator like effector nucleases (TALEN)
- Clustered regularly interspaced short palindromic repeats (CRISPR/Cas9) system.

==== Meganucleases ====
Meganucleases, discovered in the late 1980s, are enzymes in the endonuclease family which are characterized by their capacity to recognize and cut large DNA sequences (from 14 to 40 base pairs). The most widespread and best known meganucleases are the proteins in the LAGLIDADG family, which owe their name to a conserved amino acid sequence.

Meganucleases, found commonly in microbial species, have the unique property of having very long recognition sequences (>14bp) thus making them naturally very specific. However, there is virtually no chance of finding the exact meganuclease required to act on a chosen specific DNA sequence. To overcome this challenge, mutagenesis and high throughput screening methods have been used to create meganuclease variants that recognize unique sequences. Others have been able to fuse various meganucleases and create hybrid enzymes that recognize a new sequence. Yet others have attempted to alter the DNA interacting aminoacids of the meganuclease to design sequence specific meganucleases in a method named rationally designed meganuclease. Another approach involves using computer models to try to predict as accurately as possible the activity of the modified meganucleases and the specificity of the recognized nucleic sequence.

A large bank containing several tens of thousands of protein units has been created. These units can be combined to obtain chimeric meganucleases that recognize the target site, thereby providing research and development tools that meet a wide range of needs (fundamental research, health, agriculture, industry, energy, etc.) These include the industrial-scale production of two meganucleases able to cleave the human XPC gene; mutations in this gene result in Xeroderma pigmentosum, a severe monogenic disorder that predisposes the patients to skin cancer and burns whenever their skin is exposed to UV rays.

Meganucleases have the benefit of causing less toxicity in cells than methods such as Zinc finger nuclease (ZFN), likely because of more stringent DNA sequence recognition; however, the construction of sequence-specific enzymes for all possible sequences is costly and time-consuming, as one is not benefiting from combinatorial possibilities that methods such as ZFNs and TALEN-based fusions utilize.

==== Zinc finger nucleases ====
As opposed to meganucleases, the concept behind ZFNs and TALEN technology is based on a non-specific DNA cutting catalytic domain, which can then be linked to specific DNA sequence recognizing peptides such as zinc fingers and transcription activator-like effectors (TALEs). The first step to this was to find an endonuclease whose DNA recognition site and cleaving site were separate from each other, a situation that is not the most common among restriction enzymes. Once this enzyme was found, its cleaving portion could be separated which would be very non-specific as it would have no recognition ability. This portion could then be linked to sequence recognizing peptides that could lead to very high specificity.

Zinc finger motifs occur in several transcription factors. The zinc ion, found in 8% of all human proteins, plays an important role in the organization of their three-dimensional structure. In transcription factors, it is most often located at the protein-DNA interaction sites, where it stabilizes the motif. The C-terminal part of each finger is responsible for the specific recognition of the DNA sequence.

The recognized sequences are short, made up of around 3 base pairs, but by combining 6 to 8 zinc fingers whose recognition sites have been characterized, it is possible to obtain specific proteins for sequences of around 20 base pairs. It is therefore possible to control the expression of a specific gene. It has been demonstrated that this strategy can be used to promote a process of angiogenesis in animals. It is also possible to fuse a protein constructed in this way with the catalytic domain of an endonuclease in order to induce a targeted DNA break, and therefore to use these proteins as genome engineering tools.

The method generally adopted for this involves associating two DNA binding proteins – each containing 3 to 6 specifically chosen zinc fingers – with the catalytic domain of the FokI endonuclease which need to dimerize to cleave the double-strand DNA. The two proteins recognize two DNA sequences that are a few nucleotides apart. Linking the two zinc finger proteins to their respective sequences brings the two FokI domains closer together. FokI requires dimerization to have nuclease activity and this means the specificity increases dramatically as each nuclease partner would recognize a unique DNA sequence. To enhance this effect, FokI nucleases have been engineered that can only function as heterodimers.

Several approaches are used to design specific zinc finger nucleases for the chosen sequences. The most widespread involves combining zinc-finger units with known specificities (modular assembly). Various selection techniques, using bacteria, yeast or mammal cells have been developed to identify the combinations that offer the best specificity and the best cell tolerance. Although the direct genome-wide characterization of zinc finger nuclease activity has not been reported, an assay that measures the total number of double-strand DNA breaks in cells found that only one to two such breaks occur above background in cells treated with zinc finger nucleases with a 24 bp composite recognition site and obligate heterodimer FokI nuclease domains.

The heterodimer functioning nucleases would avoid the possibility of unwanted homodimer activity and thus increase specificity of the DSB. Although the nuclease portions of both ZFNs and TALEN constructs have similar properties, the difference between these engineered nucleases is in their DNA recognition peptide. ZFNs rely on Cys2-His2 zinc fingers and TALEN constructs on TALEs. Both of these DNA recognizing peptide domains have the characteristic that they are naturally found in combinations in their proteins. Cys2-His2 Zinc fingers typically happen in repeats that are 3 bp apart and are found in diverse combinations in a variety of nucleic acid interacting proteins such as transcription factors. Each finger of the Zinc finger domain is completely independent and the binding capacity of one finger is impacted by its neighbor. TALEs on the other hand are found in repeats with a one-to-one recognition ratio between the amino acids and the recognized nucleotide pairs. Because both zinc fingers and TALEs happen in repeated patterns, different combinations can be tried to create a wide variety of sequence specificities. Zinc fingers have been more established in these terms and approaches such as modular assembly (where Zinc fingers correlated with a triplet sequence are attached in a row to cover the required sequence), OPEN (low-stringency selection of peptide domains vs. triplet nucleotides followed by high-stringency selections of peptide combination vs. the final target in bacterial systems), and bacterial one-hybrid screening of zinc finger libraries among other methods have been used to make site specific nucleases.

Zinc finger nucleases are research and development tools that have already been used to modify a range of genomes, in particular by the laboratories in the Zinc Finger Consortium. The US company Sangamo BioSciences uses zinc finger nucleases to carry out research into the genetic engineering of stem cells and the modification of immune cells for therapeutic purposes. Modified T lymphocytes are currently undergoing phase I clinical trials to treat a type of brain tumor (glioblastoma) and in the fight against AIDS.

==== TALEN ====
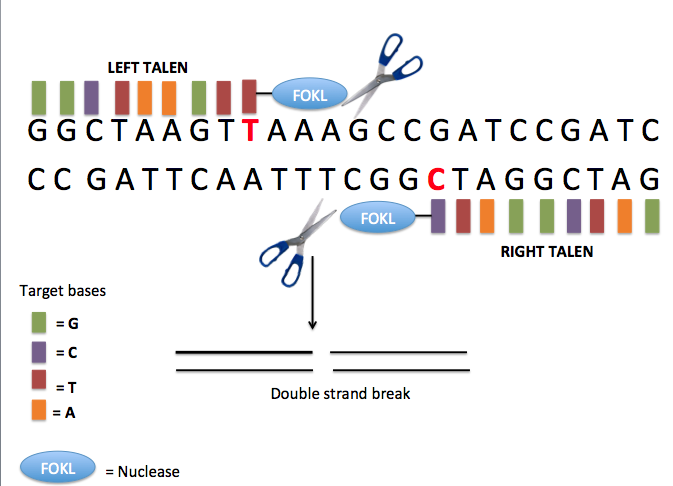
General overview of the TALEN process

Transcription activator-like effector nucleases (TALENs) are specific DNA-binding proteins that feature an array of 33 or 34-amino acid repeats. TALENs are artificial restriction enzymes designed by fusing the DNA cutting domain of a nuclease to TALE domains, which can be tailored to specifically recognize a unique DNA sequence. These fusion proteins serve as readily targetable "DNA scissors" for gene editing applications that enable to perform targeted genome modifications such as sequence insertion, deletion, repair and replacement in living cells. The DNA binding domains, which can be designed to bind any desired DNA sequence, comes from TAL effectors, DNA-binding proteins excreted by plant pathogenic Xanthomanos app. TAL effectors consists of repeated domains, each of which contains a highly conserved sequence of 34 amino acids, and recognize a single DNA nucleotide within the target site. The nuclease can create double strand breaks at the target site that can be repaired by error-prone non-homologous end-joining (NHEJ), resulting in gene disruptions through the introduction of small insertions or deletions. Each repeat is conserved, with the exception of the so-called repeat variable di-residues (RVDs) at amino acid positions 12 and 13. The RVDs determine the DNA sequence to which the TALE will bind. This simple one-to-one correspondence between the TALE repeats and the corresponding DNA sequence makes the process of assembling repeat arrays to recognize novel DNA sequences straightforward. These TALEs can be fused to the catalytic domain from a DNA nuclease, FokI, to generate a transcription activator-like effector nuclease (TALEN). The resultant TALEN constructs combine specificity and activity, effectively generating engineered sequence-specific nucleases that bind and cleave DNA sequences only at pre-selected sites. The TALEN target recognition system is based on an easy-to-predict code. TAL nucleases are specific to their target due in part to the length of their 30+ base pairs binding site. TALEN can be performed within a 6 base pairs range of any single nucleotide in the entire genome.

TALEN constructs are used in a similar way to designed zinc finger nucleases, and have three advantages in targeted mutagenesis: (1) DNA binding specificity is higher, (2) off-target effects are lower, and (3) construction of DNA-binding domains is easier.

==== CRISPR ====
CRISPRs (Clustered Regularly Interspaced Short Palindromic Repeats) are genetic elements that bacteria use as a kind of acquired immunity to protect against viruses. They consist of short sequences that originate from viral genomes and have been incorporated into the bacterial genome. Cas (CRISPR associated proteins) process these sequences and cut matching viral DNA sequences. By introducing plasmids containing Cas genes and specifically constructed CRISPRs into eukaryotic cells, the eukaryotic genome can be cut at any desired position.

=== Large genomic insertions ===
Larger modifications used to be inefficient and error-prone but recent developments allow fairly reliable larger modifications. For instance, the quadruple pegRNA strategy (QuadPE) allowed researchers to stably insert large DNA fragments into human cells ranging from 1.6 to 26 kb at an efficiency of about 40%.

=== Base editing ===
Base editing is one of the earliest and most efficient methods of genome editing. Although it is only appropriate for precise editing of single nucleotide bases, it is more reliable than inserting or removing nucleotide sequences, as it does not require breaking and recombining the genomic DNA strands. Thus, it avoids the random insertions and deletions associated with these procedures. It employs nucleobase modifying enzymes directed by nucleic acid guide sequences. It was first described in the 1990s, but it has seen a resurgence more recently.

=== ARCUT ===
ARCUT stands for artificial restriction DNA cutter, it is a technique developed by Makoto Komiyama. This method uses pseudo-complementary peptide nucleic acid (pcPNA), for identifying cleavage site within the chromosome. Once pcPNA specifies the site, excision is carried out by cerium (CE) and EDTA (chemical mixture), which performs the splicing function.

== Precision and efficiency of engineered nucleases ==
Meganucleases method of gene editing is the least efficient of the methods mentioned above. Due to the nature of its DNA-binding element and the cleaving element, it is limited to recognizing one potential target every 1,000 nucleotides. ZFN was developed to overcome the limitations of meganuclease. The number of possible targets ZFN can recognise was increased to one in every 140 nucleotides. However, both methods are unpredictable because of their DNA-binding elements affecting each other. As a result, high degrees of expertise and lengthy and costly validation processes are required.

TALE nucleases, being the most precise and specific method, yields a higher efficiency than the previous two methods. It achieves such efficiency because the DNA-binding element consists of an array of TALE subunits, each of them having the capability of recognizing a specific DNA nucleotide chain independently from others, resulting in a higher number of target sites with high precision. New TALE nucleases take about one week and a few hundred dollars to create, with specific expertise in molecular biology and protein engineering.

CRISPR nucleases have a slightly lower precision when compared to the TALE nucleases. This is caused by the need to have a specific nucleotide at one end in order to produce the guide RNA that CRISPR uses to repair the double-strand break it induces. It has been shown to be the quickest and cheapest method, only costing less than two hundred dollars and a few days of time. CRISPR also requires the least amount of expertise in molecular biology, as the design lays in the guide RNA instead of the proteins. One major advantage that CRISPR has over the ZFN and TALEN methods is that it can be directed to target different DNA sequences using its ~80nt CRISPR sgRNAs, while both ZFN and TALEN methods required construction and testing of the proteins created for targeting each DNA sequence.

Because off-target activity of an active nuclease would have potentially dangerous consequences at the genetic and organismal levels, the precision of meganucleases, ZFNs, CRISPR, and TALEN-based fusions has been an active area of research. While variable figures have been reported, ZFNs tend to have more cytotoxicity than TALEN methods or RNA-guided nucleases, while TALEN and RNA-guided approaches tend to have the greatest efficiency and fewer off-target effects. Based on the maximum theoretical distance between DNA binding and nuclease activity, TALEN approaches result in the greatest precision.

== Multiplex Automated Genomic Engineering (MAGE) ==
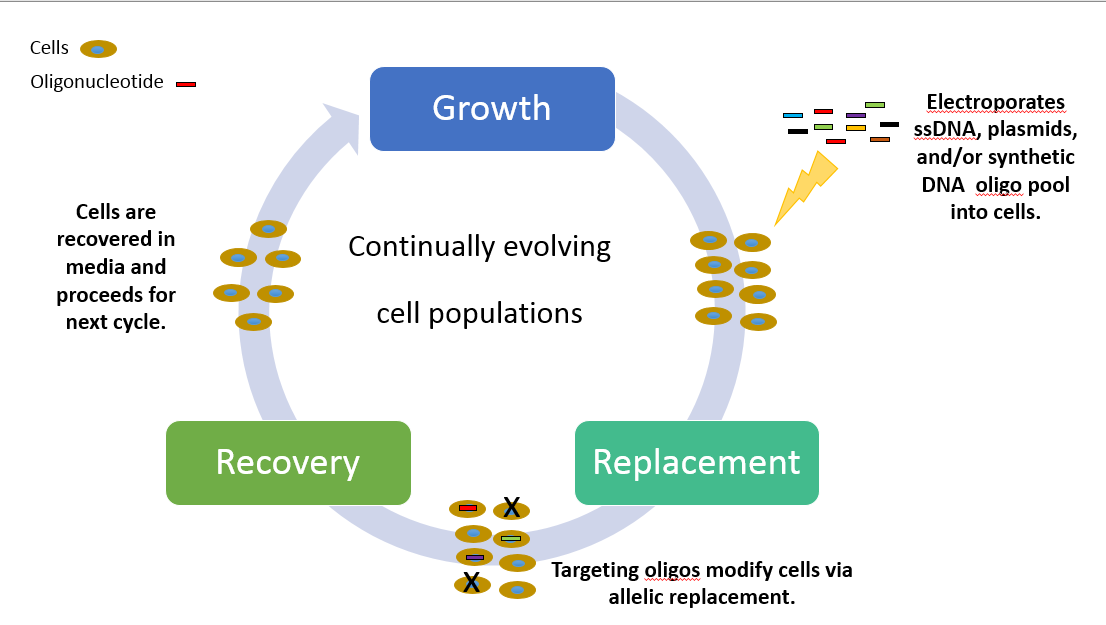
Synthetic DNA is repeatedly introduced at multiple targeted areas of the chromosome and/or loci and then is replicated producing cells with/without mutations.

The conventional approach to studying genomic diversity—modifying one gene, observing the result, and repeating the process—can be slow, expensive, and inefficient. Researchers at the Wyss Institute at Harvard University designed the MAGE system to address these concerns. It allows for quick and efficient manipulations of a genome, in a machine small enough to put on top of a small kitchen table. Those mutations combine with the variation that naturally occurs during cell mitosis creating billions of cellular mutations.

Chemically combined, synthetic single-stranded DNA (ssDNA) and a pool of oligonucleotides are introduced at targeted areas of the cell, thereby creating genetic modifications. The cyclical process involves transformation of ssDNA (by electroporation) followed by outgrowth, during which bacteriophage homologous recombination proteins mediate annealing of ssDNAs to their genomic targets. Experiments targeting selective phenotypic markers are screened and identified by plating the cells on differential medias. Each cycle ultimately takes 2.5 hours to process, with additional time required to grow isogenic cultures and characterize mutations. By iteratively introducing libraries of mutagenic ssDNAs targeting multiple sites, MAGE can generate combinatorial genetic diversity in a cell population. There can be up to 50 genome edits, from single nucleotide base pairs to whole genome or gene networks simultaneously with results in a matter of days.

MAGE experiments can be divided into three classes, characterized by varying degrees of scale and complexity: (i) many target sites, single genetic mutations; (ii) single target site, many genetic mutations; and (iii) many target sites, many genetic mutations. An example of class three was reflected in 2009, where Church and colleagues were able to program Escherichia coli to produce five times the normal amount of lycopene, an antioxidant normally found in tomato seeds and linked to anti-cancer properties. They applied MAGE to optimize the 1-deoxy-D-xylulose 5-phosphate (DXP) metabolic pathway in Escherichia coli to overproduce isoprenoid lycopene. It took them about 3 days and just over $1,000 in materials. The ease, speed, and cost efficiency in which MAGE can alter genomes can transform how industries approach the manufacturing and production of important compounds in the bioengineering, bioenergy, biomedical engineering, synthetic biology, pharmaceutical, agricultural, and chemical industries.

== Applications ==
Plants, animals and human genes that are successfully targeted using ZFN, which demonstrates the generality of this approach

As of 2012, efficient genome editing had been developed for a wide range of experimental systems ranging from plants to animals, often beyond clinical interest, and was becoming a standard experimental strategy in research labs. The recent generation of rat, zebrafish, maize and tobacco ZFN-mediated mutants and the improvements in TALEN-based approaches testify to the significance of the methods, and the list is expanding rapidly. Genome editing with engineered nucleases will likely contribute to many fields of life sciences from studying gene functions in plants and animals to gene therapy in humans. For instance, the field of synthetic biology which aims to engineer cells and organisms to perform novel functions, is likely to benefit from the ability of engineered nuclease to add or remove genomic elements and therefore create complex systems. In addition, gene functions can be studied using stem cells with engineered nucleases.

Listed below are some specific tasks this method can carry out:

- Targeted gene mutation
- Gene therapy
- Creating chromosome rearrangement
- Study gene function with stem cells
- Transgenic animals
- Endogenous gene labeling
- Targeted transgene addition

=== Targeted gene modification in animals ===
The combination of recent discoveries in genetic engineering, particularly gene editing and the latest improvement in bovine reproduction technologies (e.g. in vitro embryo culture) allows for genome editing directly in fertilised oocytes using synthetic highly specific endonucleases. In particular CRISPR/Cas9 engineered endonucleases allows the use of multiple guide RNAs for simultaneous Knockouts (KO) in one step by cytoplasmic direct injection (CDI) on mammalian zygotes.

Furthermore, gene editing can be applied to certain types of fish in aquaculture such as Atlantic salmon. Gene editing in fish is currently experimental, but the possibilities include growth, disease resistance, sterility, controlled reproduction, and colour. Selecting for these traits can allow for a more sustainable environment and better welfare for the fish.

AquAdvantage salmon is a genetically modified Atlantic salmon developed by AquaBounty Technologies. The growth hormone-regulating gene in the Atlantic salmon is replaced with the growth hormone-regulating gene from the Pacific Chinook salmon and a promoter sequence from the ocean pout

=== Targeted gene modification in plants ===
Overview of GEEN workflow and editing possibilities

Genome editing using Meganuclease, ZFNs, and TALEN provides a new strategy for genetic manipulation in plants and are likely to assist in the engineering of desired plant traits by modifying endogenous genes. For instance, site-specific gene addition in major crop species can be used for 'trait stacking' whereby several desired traits are physically linked to ensure their co-segregation during the breeding processes. Progress in such cases have been recently reported in Arabidopsis thaliana and Zea mays. In Arabidopsis thaliana, using ZFN-assisted gene targeting, two herbicide-resistant genes (tobacco acetolactate synthase SuRA and SuRB) were introduced to SuR loci with as high as 2% transformed cells with mutations. In Zea mays, disruption of the target locus was achieved by ZFN-induced DSBs and the resulting NHEJ. ZFN was also used to drive herbicide-tolerance gene expression cassette (PAT) into the targeted endogenous locus IPK1 in this case. Such genome modification observed in the regenerated plants has been shown to be inheritable and was transmitted to the next generation. A potentially successful example of the application of genome editing techniques in crop improvement can be found in banana, where scientists used CRISPR/Cas9 editing to inactivate the endogenous banana streak virus in the B genome of banana (Musa spp.) to overcome a major challenge in banana breeding.

In addition, TALEN-based genome engineering has been extensively tested and optimized for use in plants. TALEN fusions have also been used by a U.S. food ingredient company, Calyxt, to improve the quality of soybean oil products and to increase the storage potential of potatoes

Several optimizations need to be made in order to improve editing plant genomes using ZFN-mediated targeting. There is a need for reliable design and subsequent test of the nucleases, the absence of toxicity of the nucleases, the appropriate choice of the plant tissue for targeting, the routes of induction of enzyme activity, the lack of off-target mutagenesis, and a reliable detection of mutated cases.

A common delivery method for CRISPR/Cas9 in plants is Agrobacterium-based transformation. T-DNA is introduced directly into the plant genome by a T4SS mechanism. Cas9 and gRNA-based expression cassettes are turned into Ti plasmids, which are transformed in Agrobacterium for plant application. To improve Cas9 delivery in live plants, viruses are being used more effective transgene delivery.

== Research ==
=== Gene therapy ===
The ideal gene therapy practice is one that replaces the defective gene with a normal allele at its natural location. This is advantageous over a virally-delivered gene, as there is no need to include the full coding sequences and regulatory sequences when only a small proportion of the gene needs to be altered, as is often the case. The expression of the partially replaced genes is also more consistent with normal cell biology than full genes that are carried by viral vectors.

The first clinical use of TALEN-based genome editing was in the treatment of CD19+ acute lymphoblastic leukemia in an 11-month old child in 2015. Modified donor T cells were engineered to attack the leukemia cells, to be resistant to Alemtuzumab, and to evade detection by the host immune system after introduction.

Extensive research has been done in cells and animals using CRISPR-Cas9 to attempt to correct genetic mutations which cause genetic diseases such as Down syndrome, spina bifida, anencephaly, and Turner and Klinefelter syndromes.

In February 2019, medical scientists working with Sangamo Therapeutics, headquartered in Richmond, California, announced the first ever "in body" human gene editing therapy to permanently alter DNA - in a patient with Hunter syndrome. Clinical trials by Sangamo involving gene editing using Zinc Finger Nuclease (ZFN) are ongoing.

=== Eradicating diseases ===
Researchers have used CRISPR-Cas9 gene drives to modify genes associated with sterility in A. gambiae, the vector for malaria. This technique has further implications in eradicating other vector borne diseases such as yellow fever, dengue, and Zika.

The CRISPR-Cas9 system can be programmed to modulate the population of any bacterial species by targeting clinical genotypes or epidemiological isolates. It can selectively enable the beneficial bacterial species over the harmful ones by eliminating pathogen, which gives it an advantage over broad-spectrum antibiotics.

Antiviral applications for therapies targeting human viruses such as HIV, herpes, and hepatitis B virus are under research. CRISPR can be used to target the virus or the host to disrupt genes encoding the virus cell-surface receptor proteins. In November 2018, He Jiankui announced that he had edited two human embryos, to attempt to disable the gene for CCR5, which codes for a receptor that HIV uses to enter cells. He said that twin girls, Lulu and Nana, had been born a few weeks earlier. He said that the girls still carried functional copies of CCR5 along with disabled CCR5 (mosaicism) and were still vulnerable to HIV. The work was widely condemned as unethical, dangerous, and premature.

In January 2019, scientists in China reported the creation of five identical cloned gene-edited monkeys, using the same cloning technique that was used with Zhong Zhong and Hua Hua – the first ever cloned monkeys - and Dolly the sheep, and the same gene-editing Crispr-Cas9 technique allegedly used by He Jiankui in creating the first ever gene-modified human babies Lulu and Nana. The monkey clones were made in order to study several medical diseases.

== Prospects and limitations ==
In the future, an important goal of research into genome editing with engineered nucleases must be the improvement of the safety and specificity of the nucleases action. For example, improving the ability to detect off-target events can improve our ability to learn about ways of preventing them. In addition, zinc-fingers used in ZFNs are seldom completely specific, and some may cause a toxic reaction. However, the toxicity has been reported to be reduced by modifications done on the cleavage domain of the ZFN.

In addition, research by Dana Carroll into modifying the genome with engineered nucleases has shown the need for better understanding of the basic recombination and repair machinery of DNA. In the future, a possible method to identify secondary targets would be to capture broken ends from cells expressing the ZFNs and to sequence the flanking DNA using high-throughput sequencing.

Because of the ease of use and cost-efficiency of CRISPR, extensive research is currently being done on it. There are now more publications on CRISPR than ZFN and TALEN despite how recent the discovery of CRISPR is. Both CRISPR and TALEN are favored to be the choices to be implemented in large-scale productions due to their precision and efficiency.

Genome editing occurs also as a natural process without artificial genetic engineering. The agents that are competent to edit genetic codes are viruses or subviral RNA-agents.

Although DNA has higher efficiency than many other methods in reverse genetics, it is still not highly efficient; in many cases less than half of the treated populations obtain the desired changes. For example, when one is planning to use the cell's NHEJ to create a mutation, the cell's HDR systems will also be at work correcting the DSB with lower mutational rates.

Traditionally, mice have been the most common choice for researchers as a host of a disease model. CRISPR can help bridge the gap between this model and human clinical trials by creating transgenic disease models in larger animals such as pigs, dogs, and non-human primates. Using the CRISPR-Cas9 system, the programmed Cas9 protein and the sgRNA can be directly introduced into fertilized zygotes to achieve the desired gene modifications when creating transgenic models in rodents. This allows bypassing of the usual cell targeting stage in generating transgenic lines, and as a result, it reduces generation time by 90%.

One potential that CRISPR brings with its effectiveness is the application of xenotransplantation. In previous research trials, CRISPR demonstrated the ability to target and eliminate endogenous retroviruses, which reduces the risk of transmitting diseases and reduces immune barriers. Eliminating these problems improves donor organ function, which brings this application closer to a reality.

In plants, genome editing is seen as a viable solution to the conservation of biodiversity. Gene drive are a potential tool to alter the reproductive rate of invasive species, although there are significant associated risks.

=== Human enhancement ===
Many transhumanists see genome editing as a potential tool for human enhancement. Australian biologist and Professor of Genetics David Andrew Sinclair notes that "the new technologies with genome editing will allow it to be used on individuals (...) to have (...) healthier children" – designer babies. According to a September 2016 report by the Nuffield Council on Bioethics in the future it may be possible to enhance people with genes from other organisms or wholly synthetic genes to for example improve night vision and sense of smell. George Church has compiled a list of potential genetic modifications for possibly advantageous traits such as less need for sleep, cognition-related changes that protect against Alzheimer's disease, disease resistances and enhanced learning abilities along with some of the associated studies and potential negative effects.

The American National Academy of Sciences and National Academy of Medicine issued a report in February 2017 giving qualified support to human genome editing. They recommended that clinical trials for genome editing might one day be permitted once answers have been found to safety and efficiency problems "but only for serious conditions under stringent oversight."

== Risks ==
In the 2016 Worldwide Threat Assessment of the US Intelligence Community statement United States Director of National Intelligence, James R. Clapper, named genome editing as a potential weapon of mass destruction, stating that genome editing conducted by countries with regulatory or ethical standards "different from Western countries" probably increases the risk of the creation of harmful biological agents or products. According to the statement the broad distribution, low cost, and accelerated pace of development of this technology, its deliberate or unintentional misuse might lead to far-reaching economic and national security implications. For instance, technologies such as CRISPR could be used to make "killer mosquitoes", cause plagues that wipe out staple crops, or create highly deadly viruses.

According to a September 2016 report by the Nuffield Council on Bioethics, the simplicity and low cost of tools to edit the genetic code will allow amateurs – or "biohackers" – to perform their own experiments, posing a potential risk from the release of genetically modified bugs. The review also found that the risks and benefits of modifying a person's genome – and having those changes pass on to future generations – are so complex that they demand urgent ethical scrutiny. Such modifications might have unintended consequences which could harm not only the child, but also their future children, as the altered gene would be in their sperm or eggs. In 2001 Australian researchers Ronald Jackson and Ian Ramshaw were criticized for publishing a paper in the Journal of Virology that explored the potential control of mice, a major pest in Australia, by infecting them with an altered mousepox virus that would cause infertility as the provided sensitive information could lead to the manufacture of biological weapons by potential bioterrorists who might use the knowledge to create vaccine resistant strains of other pox viruses, such as smallpox, that could affect humans. Furthermore, there are additional concerns about the ecological risks of releasing gene drives into wild populations.

== Nobel prize ==
In 2007, the Nobel Prize for Physiology or Medicine was awarded to Mario Capecchi, Martin Evans and Oliver Smithies "for their discoveries of principles for introducing specific gene modifications in mice by the use of embryonic stem cells."

In 2020, the Nobel Prize in Chemistry was awarded to Emmanuelle Charpentier and Jennifer Doudna for "the development of a method for genome editing".

== See also ==
- CRISPR/Cpf1
- Woolly mouse
- RNA editing
- Epigenome editing
- Prime editing
- Transposons as a genetic tool
- Germinal choice technology
- NgAgo, a ssDNA-guided Argonaute endonuclease
