= Dana Carroll =

American molecular biologist and biochemist

Dana Carroll is an American molecular biologist and biochemist at the University of Utah School of Medicine. He is known for his research on genome editing, in particular for establishing zinc-finger nucleases (ZFNs) as practical tools for making targeted changes to chromosomal DNA in living organisms. A 2002 study from his laboratory, in which ZFNs were used to mutate a gene in the fruit fly Drosophila melanogaster, was the first to report a successful genome editing experiment using a targetable nuclease. His work on ZFNs predates CRISPR-based editing by about a decade.

Carroll was elected to the American Academy of Arts and Sciences and the National Academy of Sciences in 2017. His other honors include the Edward Novitski Prize of the Genetics Society of America (2012), the Sober Lectureship of the American Society for Biochemistry and Molecular Biology (2013), the Utah Governor's Medal for Science and Technology (2018), and the University of Utah's Rosenblatt Prize for Excellence (2023). He was a member of the international commission that produced the 2020 report Heritable Human Genome Editing.

== Early life and education ==
Carroll was born into a family of scientists. His grandfather, William Ernest Carroll, worked in animal nutrition and animal science, and his father, William Robert Carroll, researched protein chemistry at the National Institutes of Health for more than two decades. He received a bachelor's degree in chemistry from Swarthmore College in 1965 and a Ph.D. in physical chemistry from the University of California, Berkeley, in 1970, working under Ignacio Tinoco Jr. He then held two postdoctoral positions: with John Paul at the Beatson Institute for Cancer Research in Glasgow, studying transcriptional regulation, and with Donald D. Brown at the Carnegie Institution of Washington in Baltimore, working on 5S ribosomal DNA in the frog Xenopus laevis. The studies with Brown stimulated his interest in genetic recombination.

== Career ==
=== University of Utah ===
Carroll joined the University of Utah in 1975 as an assistant professor in the Department of Microbiology. He moved to the Department of Biochemistry in 1985 as co-chair with Martin Rechsteiner. They initiated a period of growth that included the recruitment of Venki Ramakrishnan. Carroll was the department's sole chair from 1998 to 2009.

=== Zinc-finger nucleases ===
Carroll's studies of DNA recombination and repair led him to ask whether chromosomes could be cut at chosen sites. Experiments published in 1991 supported a nonconservative mechanism of homologous recombination that depends on double-strand breaks. Multiple studies by other researchers showed that both homologous recombination and local mutagenesis could be stimulated by double-strand breaks, which led him to consider introducing targeted breaks. After Srinivasan Chandrasegaran of Johns Hopkins University reported the engineering of zinc-finger nucleases, Carroll contacted him and proposed a collaboration.

Carroll began working with ZFNs in the mid-1990s, and a 2017 news report dated his development of ZFNs as an early precision genome-editing platform to about 1996. In 2002 he and co-authors, including the Drosophila geneticist Kent Golic, reported the use of ZFNs to cleave and mutate a chromosomal gene in Drosophila melanogaster. In the experiment, ZFN-induced mutation changed the flies' body color from brown to yellow. A 2025 review in BMC Biology credits this work with producing the first directed genome-edited organism, and a 2010 review in Nature Reviews Genetics lists it, together with a 2003 follow-up study in Science, among the early studies in genome editing.

The Genetics Society of America described Carroll as the first to adapt ZFNs for making targeted breaks in chromosomes in living organisms. By 2013 other researchers had adopted his approach and clinical trials of ZFN technology were under way. His methods have been used to edit the genomes of plants, livestock, insects, rodents and primates, and the University of Utah has stated that technology developed there has been used to modify more than 80 organisms. In 2018 University of Utah Health said his work showed ZFNs could improve editing efficiency by up to one million-fold and laid the groundwork for later technologies including CRISPR; a 2023 University of Utah article likewise credited his work with laying the groundwork for platforms including TALENs and CRISPR/Cas. Later reviews of the field's history continue to cite the 2002 study as an early demonstration of ZFN-based editing in an animal.

Carroll's research reflects an interest in the cellular mechanisms that genome editing relies on for making genomic alterations, as well as specific applications of the tools.

=== CRISPR-era work ===
As CRISPR-Cas9 emerged, Carroll spent ten months in 2014–2015 on sabbatical in Jacob Corn's laboratory at the Innovative Genomics Institute (IGI) in Berkeley, where he and Mark DeWitt began a sickle-cell disease project, and he taught a CRISPR course at the IGI in the summers of 2015 to 2017. He closed his Utah laboratory in 2018 and took a part-time IGI role focused on policy, social issues and outreach in 2019–2020.

=== Policy and ethics ===
Carroll served on the international commission, sponsored by the National Academy of Medicine, the National Academy of Sciences and the Royal Society, that produced the 2020 consensus report Heritable Human Genome Editing. The commission was tasked with defining a responsible pathway for the clinical use of heritable human genome editing.

=== Teaching and service ===
At Utah, Carroll created several graduate courses, including one bridging chemistry and basic biology, one on biomedical research for medical residents, and one on gene therapy covering technical and ethical issues. He supervised 31 graduate students and postdoctoral researchers, served on 125 graduate student supervisory committees, and served on 20 NIH study sections.

== Awards and honors ==
- 2012: Edward Novitski Prize, Genetics Society of America
- 2014: Herbert A. Sober Lectureship, American Society for Biochemistry and Molecular Biology
- 2016: Distinguished Innovation and Impact Award, University of Utah
- 2017: Member, National Academy of Sciences
- 2017: Fellow, American Academy of Arts and Sciences
- 2018: Utah Governor's Medal for Science and Technology
- 2023: Rosenblatt Prize for Excellence, University of Utah, the university's highest faculty honor

Carroll is also a fellow of the American Association for the Advancement of Science. The National Academy of Sciences lists biochemistry as his primary section and genetics as his secondary section. His 2017 American Academy election came together with two Utah colleagues, Bradley Cairns and Christopher Hacon, and the Academy lists his specialty as biochemistry, biophysics and molecular biology.

== Selected publications ==
- Bibikova M, Golic M, Golic KG, Carroll D (2002). "Targeted chromosomal cleavage and mutagenesis in Drosophila using zinc-finger nucleases". Genetics. 161 (3): 1169–1175. doi:10.1093/genetics/161.3.1169. PMC 1462166. PMID 12136019.
- Bibikova M, Beumer K, Trautman JK, Carroll D (2003). "Enhancing gene targeting with designed zinc-finger nucleases". Science. 300 (5620): 764. Bibcode:2003Sci...300..764B. doi:10.1126/science.1079512. PMID 12730594.
- Porteus MH, Carroll D (2005). "Gene targeting using zinc finger nucleases". Nature Biotechnology. 23 (8): 967–973. doi:10.1038/nbt1125. PMID 16082368.
- Carroll D (2011). "Genome engineering with zinc-finger nucleases". Genetics. 188 (4): 773–782. Bibcode:2011Genet.188..773C. doi:10.1534/genetics.111.131433. PMC 3176093. PMID 21828278.
- Carroll D (2014). "Genome engineering with targetable nucleases". Annual Review of Biochemistry. 83 (1): 409–439. Bibcode:2014ARBio..83..409C. doi:10.1146/annurev-biochem-060713-035418. PMID 24606144.
- DeWitt MA, Magis W, Bray NL, et al. (2016). "Selection-free genome editing of the sickle mutation in human adult hematopoietic stem/progenitor cells". Science Translational Medicine. 8 (360): 360ra134. doi:10.1126/scitranslmed.aaf9336. PMC 5500303. PMID 27733558.
