= Laboratory rat =

Rat used for scientific research

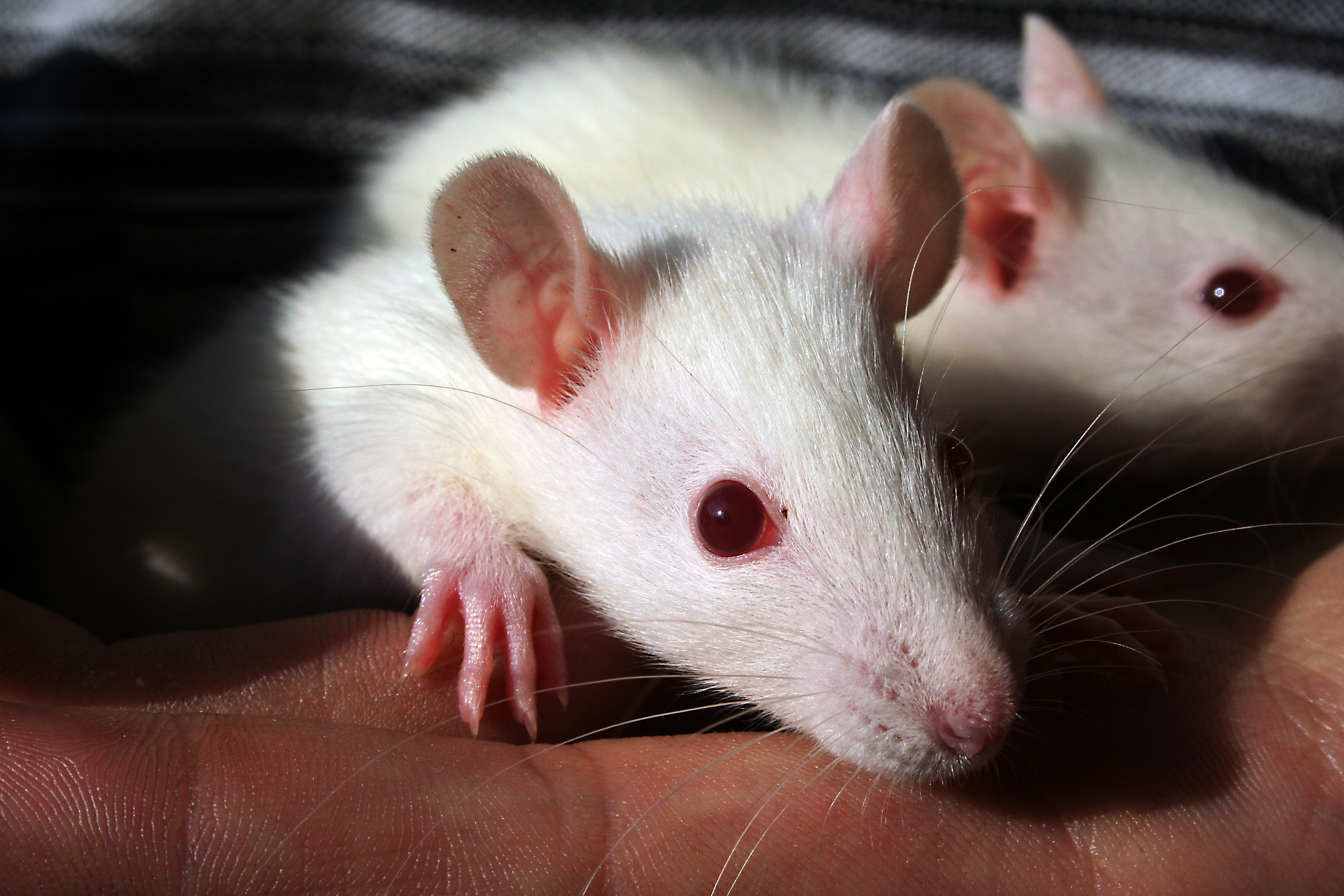
The albino laboratory rat with its red eyes and white fur is an iconic model organism for scientific research in a variety of fields.

Laboratory rats, or lab rats, is a term that refers to specific strains of domestic brown rats (fancy rats) who are bred and used for scientific research. While less commonly used for research than laboratory mice, rats have served as an important animal model for research in psychology and biomedical science. "Lab rat" is commonly used as an idiom for a test subject.

== Origins of rat breeding ==
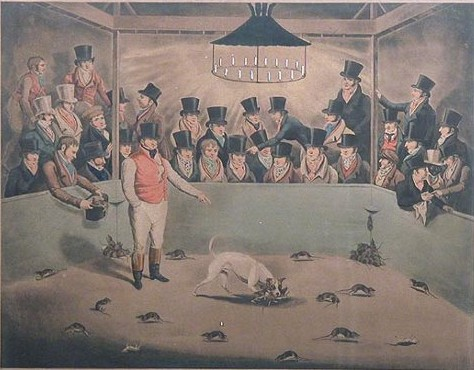
Rat-baiting

In 18th-century Europe, wild brown rats (Rattus norvegicus) ran rampant and this infestation fueled the industry of rat-catching. Rat-catchers would not only make money by trapping the rodents, but also by selling them for food or, more commonly, for rat-baiting.

Rat-baiting was a popular sport, which involved filling a pit with rats and timing how long it took for a terrier to kill them all. Over time, breeding the rats for these contests may have produced color variations, notably the albino and hooded varieties. The first time one of these albino mutants was brought into a laboratory for a study was in 1828 for an experiment on fasting. Over the next 30 years, rats were used for several more experiments and eventually the laboratory rat became the first animal domesticated for purely scientific reasons.

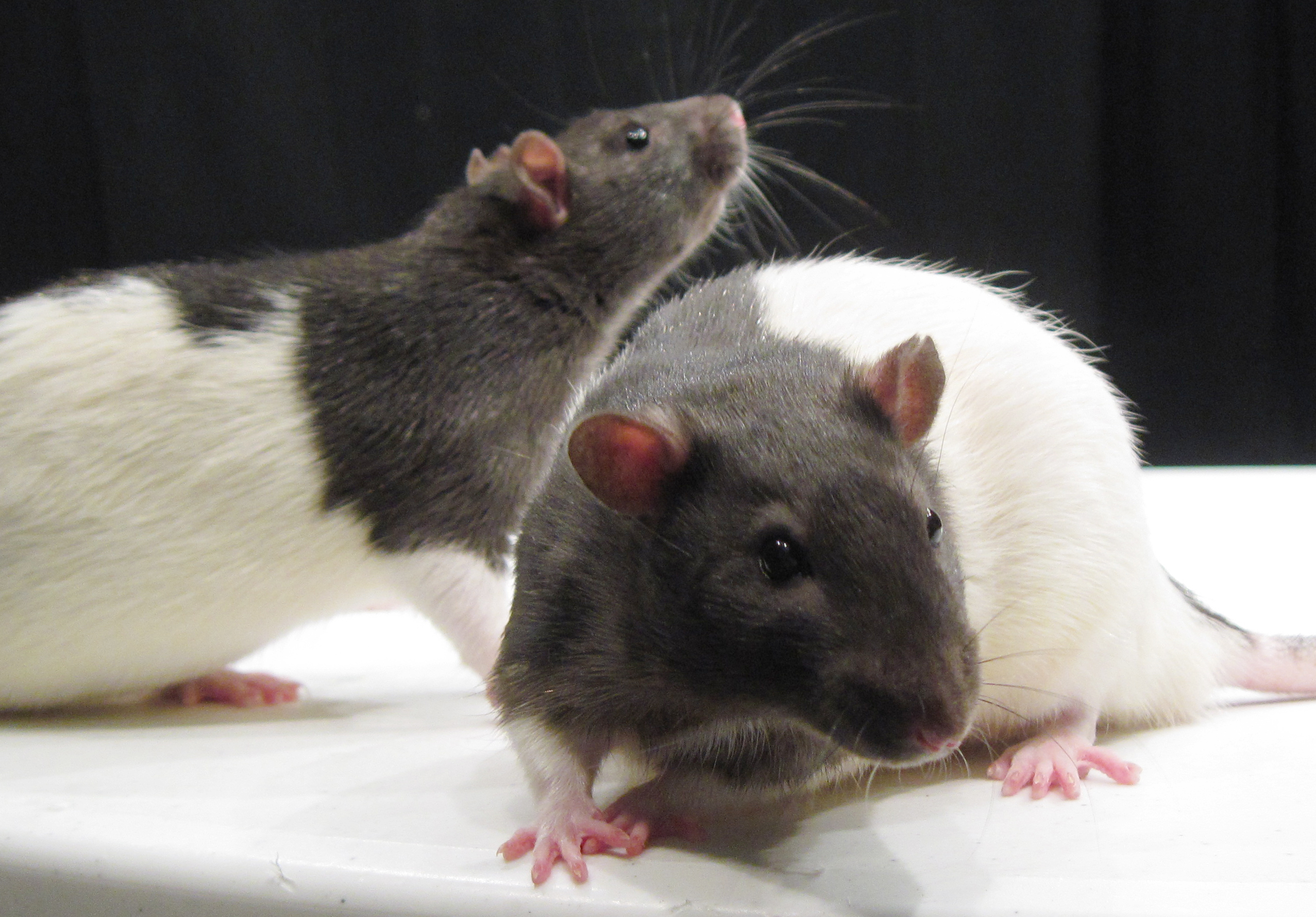
Hooded

In Japan, there was a widespread practice of keeping rats as a domesticated pet during the Edo period and in the 18th century guidebooks on keeping domestic rats were published by Youso Tamanokakehashi (1775) and Chingan Sodategusa (1787). Genetic analysis of 117 albino rat strains collected from all parts of the world carried out by a team led by Takashi Kuramoto at Kyoto University in 2012 showed that the albinos descended from hooded rats and all the albinos descended from a single ancestor. As there is evidence that the hooded rat was known as the "Japanese rat" in the early 20th century, Kuramoto concluded that one or more Japanese hooded rats might have been brought to Europe or the Americas and an albino rat that emerged as a product of the breeding of these hooded rats was the common ancestor of all the albino laboratory rats in use today.

Domestic rats often differ from wild rats (various spp. of Rodentia) in several ways: they are calmer and significantly less likely to bite, they can tolerate greater crowding, they breed earlier and produce more offspring, and their brains, livers, kidneys, adrenal glands, and hearts are smaller.

== Use in research ==
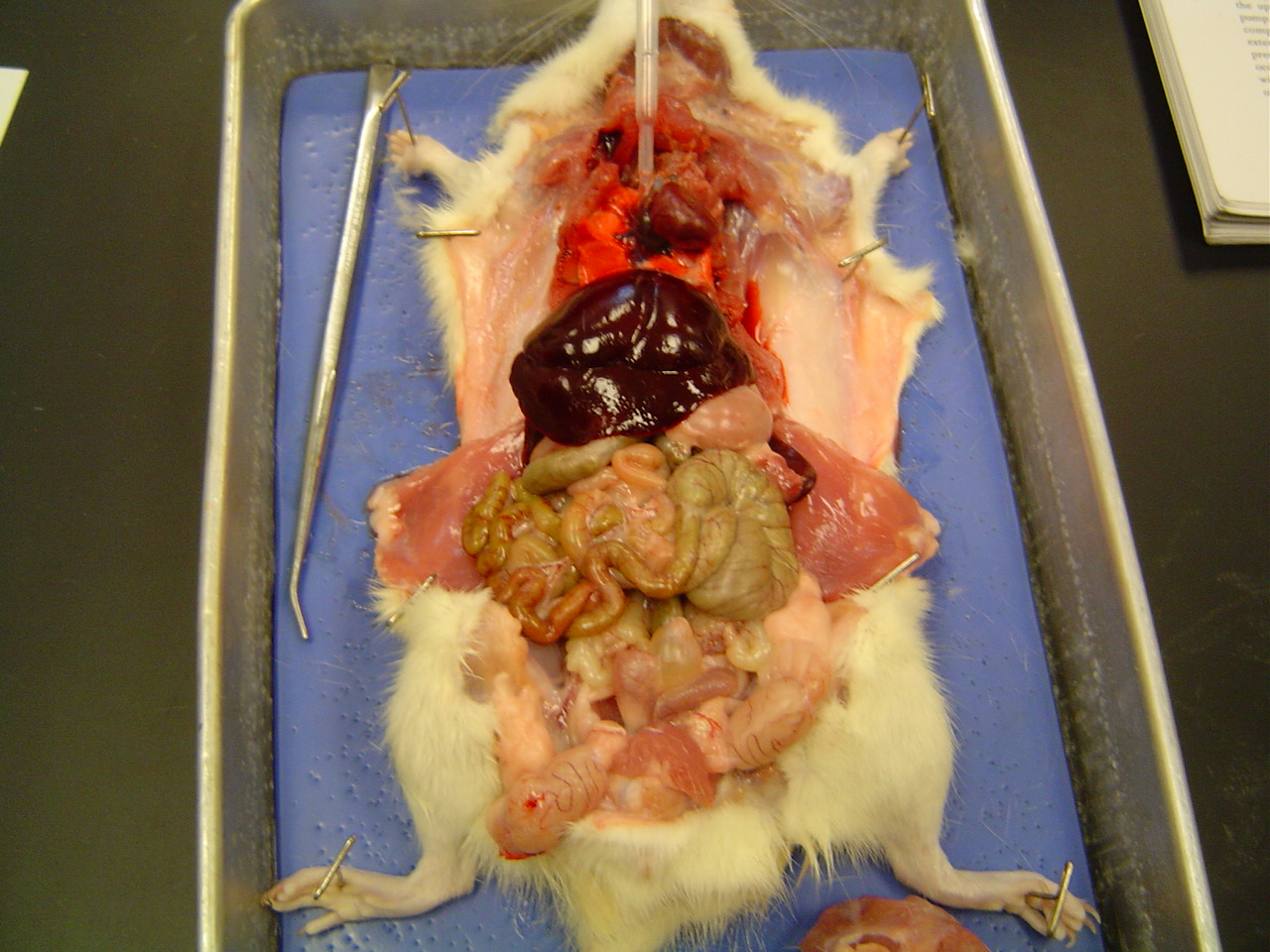
Dissection

Research labs in the late 19th and early 20th centuries used rats to study nutrition, genetics, psychology, reproduction, and cancer. Over the years, rats have been used in many experimental studies that have advanced human health and wellbeing.

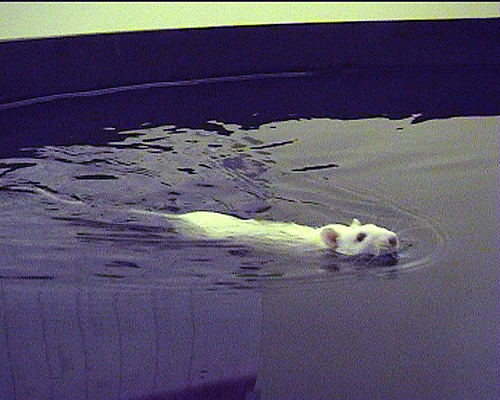
Morris water navigation test

The historical importance of this species to scientific research is reflected by the amount of literature on it: roughly 50% more than that on laboratory mice.

Laboratory rats are frequently subject to dissection or microdialysis to study internal effects on organs and the brain, such as for cancer or pharmacological research. After studies end, laboratory rats may be euthanized or, rarely, become pets.

During food rationing due to World War II, British biologists had eaten laboratory rats, creamed.

=== Nutrition ===
In 1895, Clark University in Worcester, Massachusetts, established a population of domestic albino brown rats to study the effects of diet and for other physiological studies.

The first rat colony in America used for nutrition research was started in January 1908 by Elmer McCollum and then, nutritive requirements of rats were used by Thomas Burr Osborne and Lafayette Mendel to determine the details of protein nutrition.

=== Genetics ===
The genetics of rats was studied by William Ernest Castle at the Bussey Institute of Harvard University until it closed in 1936.

Much of the genome of Rattus norvegicus has been sequenced. In October 2003, researchers succeeded in cloning two laboratory rats by nuclear transfer. This was the first in a series of developments that have begun to make rats tractable as genetic research subjects, although they still lag behind mice, which lend themselves better to the embryonic stem cell techniques typically used for genetic manipulation. Many investigators who wish to trace observations on behavior and physiology to underlying genes regard aspects of these in rats as more relevant to humans and easier to observe than in mice, giving impetus to the development of genetic research techniques applicable to rats.

=== Psychology ===
W. S. Small suggested that rats could measure the rate of learning in a maze; a suggestion employed by John B. Watson for his Ph.D. dissertation in 1903.

Laboratory rats have also proved valuable in psychological studies of learning and other mental processes, as well as to understand group behavior and overcrowding (with the work of John B. Calhoun on behavioral sink). A 2007 study found rats to possess metacognition, a mental ability previously only documented in humans and some primates.

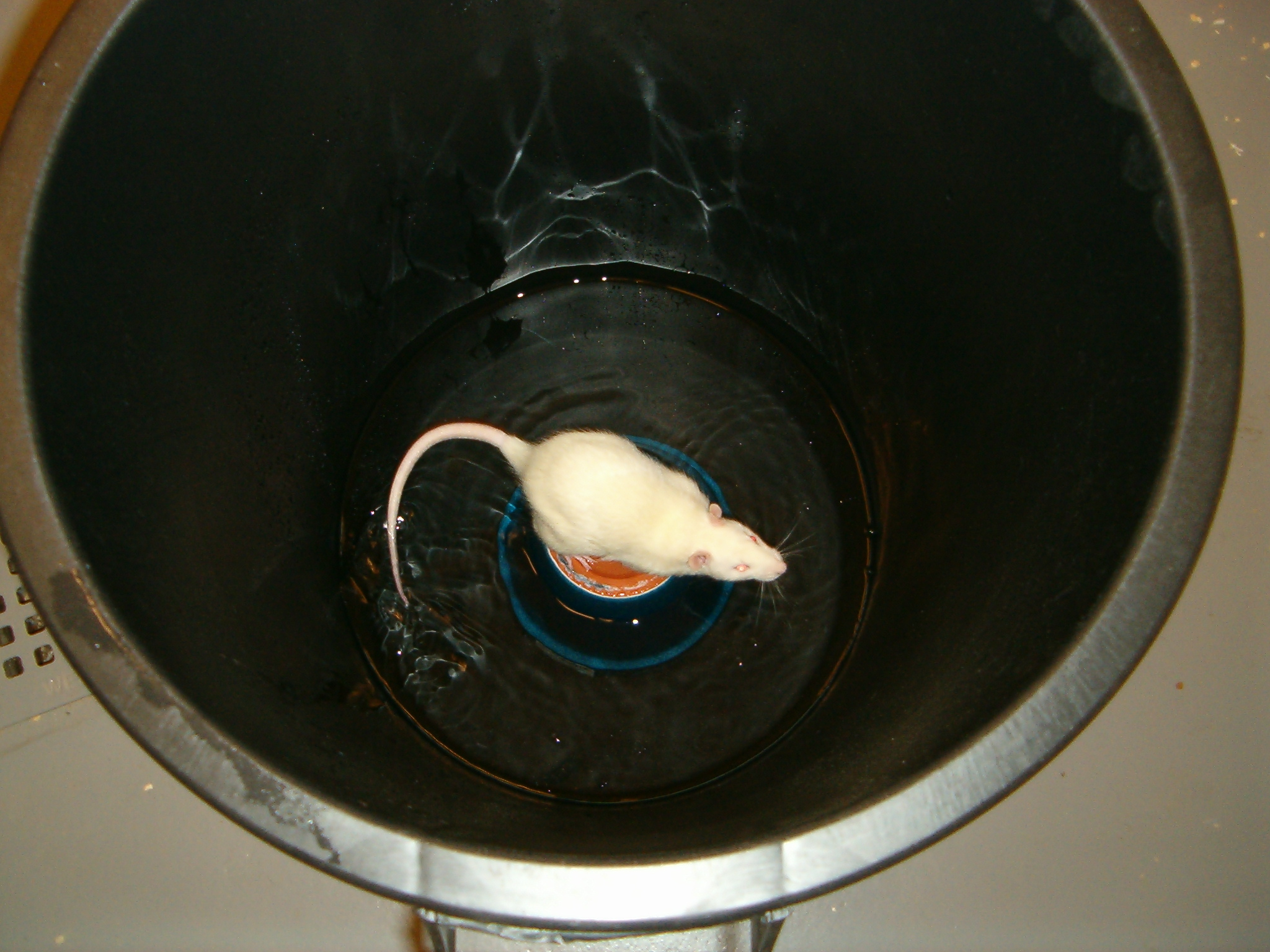
Deprivation of REM sleep using the flowerpot technique

=== Reproduction ===
The reproductive function of rats was studied at the Institute for Experimental Biology at the University of California, Berkeley by Herbert McLean Evans and Joseph A. Long.

=== Neoplasms ===
Rats have long been used in cancer research; for instance, at the Crocker Institute for Cancer Research.

Traversing complex terrain under the influence of electrode inputs to its brain

A 1972 study compared neoplasms in Sprague Dawleys from six different commercial suppliers and found highly significant differences in the incidences of endocrine and mammary tumors. There were even significant variations in the incidences of adrenal medulla tumors among rats from the same source raised in different laboratories. All but one of the testicular tumors occurred in the rats from a single supplier. The researchers found that the incidence of tumors in Sprague Dawleys from different suppliers varied as much from each other as from the other strains of rats. The authors of the study "stressed the need for extreme caution in evaluation of carcinogenicity studies conducted at different laboratories and/or on rats from different sources."

=== Aortic arches ===
The aortic arches of the rat are among the most commonly studied in murine models due to marked anatomical homology to the human cardiovascular system. Both rat and human aortic arches exhibit subsequent branching of the brachiocephalic trunk, left common carotid artery, and left subclavian artery, as well as geometrically similar, nonplanar curvature in the aortic branches. Aortic arches studied in rats exhibit abnormalities similar to those of humans, including altered pulmonary arteries and double or absent aortic arches. Despite existing anatomical analogy in the inthrathoracic position of the heart itself, the murine model of the heart and its structures remains a valuable tool for studies of human cardiovascular conditions.

=== Larynx ===
The rat's larynx has been used in experimentations that involve inhalation toxicity, allograft rejection, and irradiation responses. One experiment described four features of the rat's larynx. The first being the location and attachments of the thyroarytenoid muscle, the alar cricoarytenoid muscle, and the superior cricoarytenoid muscle, the other of the newly named muscle that ran from the arytenoid to a midline tubercle on the cricoid. The newly named muscles were not seen in the human larynx. In addition, the location and configuration of the laryngeal alar cartilage was described. The second feature was that the way the newly named muscles appear to be familiar to those in the human larynx. The third feature was that a clear understanding of how MEPs are distributed in each of the laryngeal muscles was helpful in understanding the effects of botulinum toxin injection. The MEPs in the posterior cricoarytenoid muscle, lateral cricoarytenoid muscle, cricothyroid muscle, and superior cricoarytenoid muscle were focused mostly at the midbelly. In addition, the medial thyroarytenoid muscle were focused at the midbelly while the lateral thyroarytenoid muscle MEPs were focused at the anterior third of the belly. The fourth and final feature that was cleared up was how the MEPs were distributed in the thyroarytenoid muscle.

=== Thermoregulation ===
Scientists have also spent time studying the thermoregulation of the rat's tail in research. The rat's tail works as a variable heat exchanger. The tail's blood flow allows for thermoregulation to take place because it is under control of sympathetic vasoconstrictor nerves. Vasodilation occurs when the tail temperature increases, causing heat loss. Vasoconstriction occurs when the tail temperature decreases allowing heat to be conserved. Thermoregulation in the rat tail has been used to study metabolism.

== Stocks and strains ==
A "strain", in reference to rodents, is a group in which all members are, as nearly as possible, genetically identical. In rats, this is accomplished through inbreeding. By having this kind of population, it is possible to conduct experiments on the roles of genes, or conduct experiments that exclude variations in genetics as a factor. By contrast, "outbred" populations are used when identical genotypes are unnecessary or a population with genetic variation is required, and these rats are usually referred to as "stocks" rather than "strains".

Scientists have bred many strains or "lines" of rats specifically for experimentation. Most are derived from the albino Wistar rat, which is still widely used. Other common strains are the Sprague Dawley, Fischer 344, Holtzman albino strains, Long–Evans, and Lister black hooded rats. Inbred strains are also available, but are not as commonly used as inbred mice.

=== Wistar rat ===
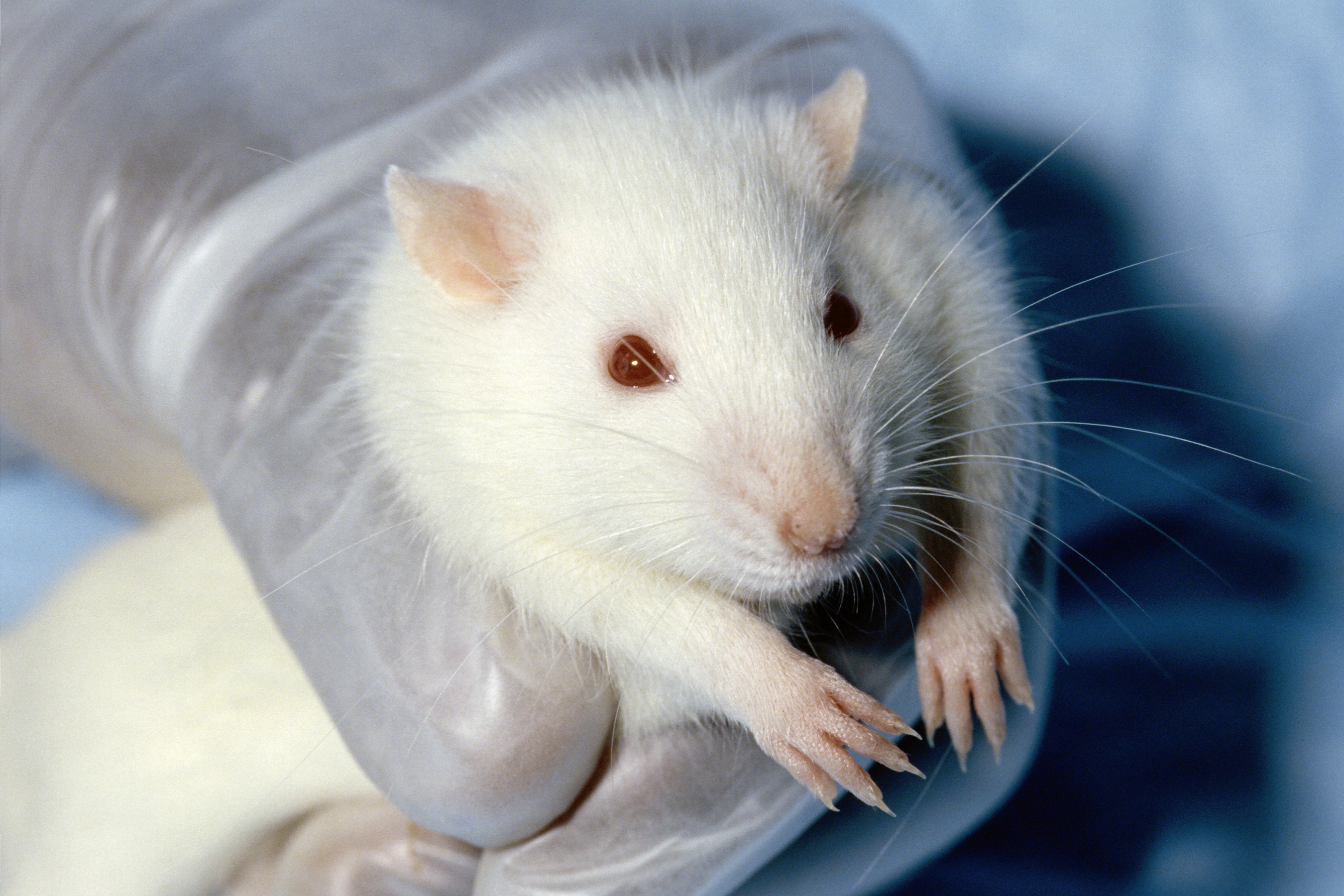
Wistar rat

The Wistar rat is an outbred albino rat. This breed was developed at the Wistar Institute in 1906 for use in biological and medical research, and is notably the first rat developed to serve as a model organism at a time when laboratories primarily used the house mouse (Mus musculus). More than half of all laboratory rat strains are descended from the original colony established by physiologist Henry Herbert Donaldson, scientific administrator Milton J. Greenman, and genetic researcher/embryologist Helen Dean King.

The Wistar rat is currently one of the most popular rats used for laboratory research. It is characterized by its wide head, long ears, and a tail length that is always less than its body length. The Sprague Dawley and Long–Evans were developed from Wistars. Wistars are more active than others like Sprague Dawleys. The spontaneously hypertensive rat and the Lewis are other well-known stocks developed from Wistars.

=== Long–Evans rat ===
The Long–Evans rat is an outbred rat developed by Long and Evans in 1915 by crossbreeding several Wistar females with a wild gray male. Long–Evans rats are white with a black hood, or occasionally white with a brown hood. They are utilized as a multipurpose model organism, frequently in behavioral research, especially in alcohol research. Long–Evans rats consume alcohol in a much higher rate compared to other strains, thus require less time for these behavioral studies.

=== Sprague Dawley rat ===
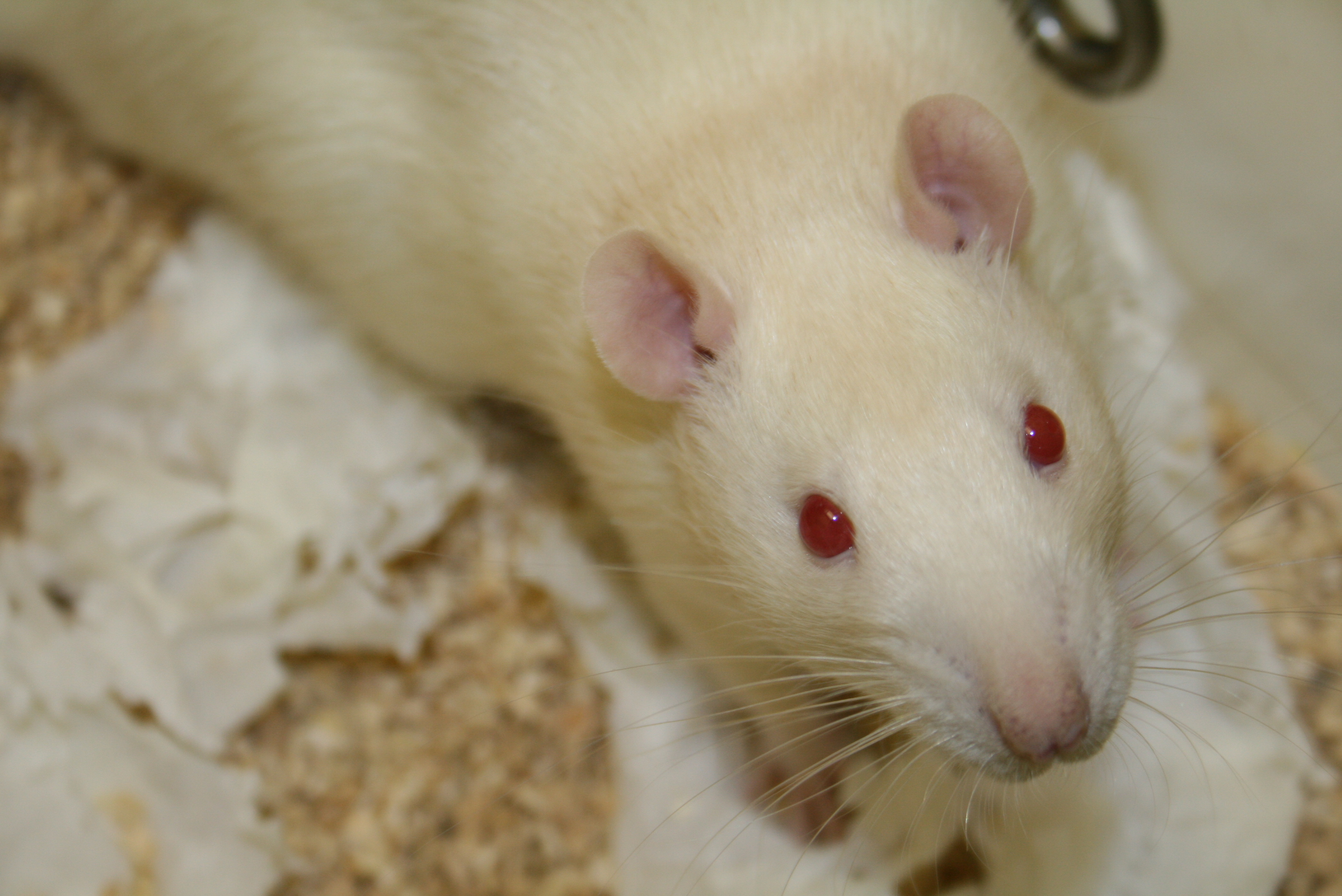
Sprague Dawley rat

The Sprague Dawley is an outbred, multipurpose breed of albino rat used extensively in medical and nutritional research. Its main advantage is its calmness and ease of handling. This breed of rat was first produced by the Sprague Dawley farms (later to become the Sprague Dawley Animal Company) in Madison, Wisconsin, in 1925. The name was originally hyphenated, although the brand styling today (Sprague Dawley, the trademark used by Inotiv) is not. The average litter size of the Sprague Dawley rat is 11.0.

These rats typically have a longer tail in proportion to their body length than Wistars. They were used in the Séralini affair, where the herbicide RoundUp was claimed to increase the occurrence of tumor in these rats. However, since these rats are known to grow tumors at a high (and very variable) rate, the study was considered flawed in design and its findings unsubstantiated.

=== Biobreeding rat ===
The biobreeding rat (a.k.a. the biobreeding diabetes-prone rat or BBDP rat) is an inbred strain that spontaneously develops autoimmune type 1 diabetes. Like NOD mice, biobreeding rats are used as an animal model for Type 1 diabetes. The strain re-capitulates many of the features of human type 1 diabetes and has contributed greatly to the research of T1DM pathogenesis.

=== Brattleboro rat ===
The Brattleboro rat is a strain that was developed by Henry A. Schroeder and technician Tim Vinton in West Brattleboro, Vermont, beginning in 1961, for Dartmouth Medical School. It has a naturally occurring genetic mutation that makes specimens unable to produce the hormone vasopressin, which helps control kidney function. The rats were being raised for laboratory use by Henry Schroeder and technician Tim Vinton, who noticed that the litter of 17 drank and urinated excessively.

=== Hairless rat ===
Hairless laboratory rats provide researchers with valuable data regarding compromised immune systems and genetic kidney diseases. It is estimated that there are over 25 genes that cause recessive hairlessness in laboratory rats. The more common ones are denoted as rnu (Rowett nude), fz (fuzzy), and shn (shorn).

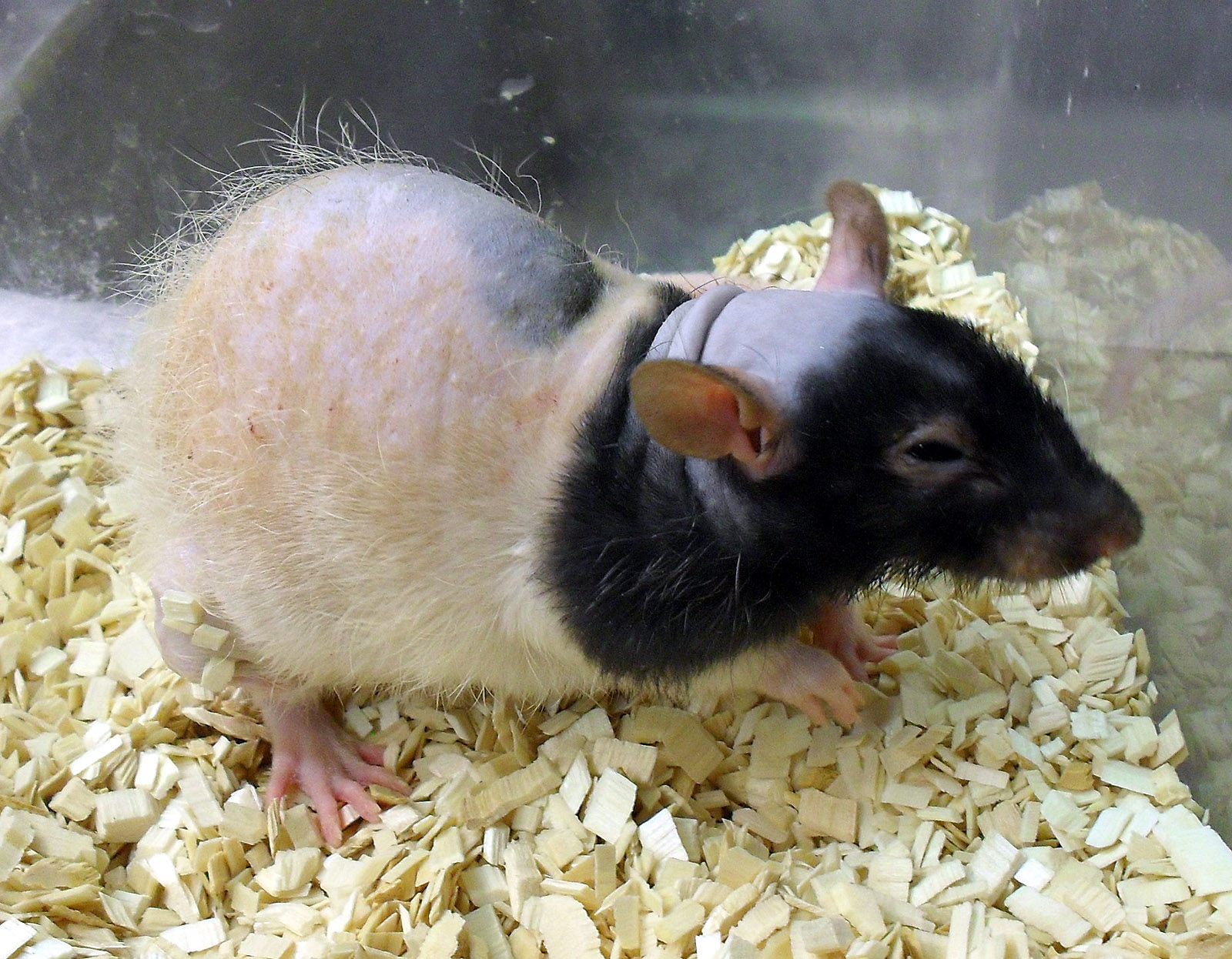
A Rowett nude rat

- Rowett nude rats, first identified in 1953 in Scotland, have no thymus. The lack of this organ severely compromises their immune system, with infections of the respiratory tract and eyes increasing the most dramatically.
- Fuzzy rats were identified in 1976 in a Pennsylvania lab. The leading cause of death among fz/fz rats is ultimately a progressive kidney failure that begins around the age of 1 year.
- Shorn rats were bred from Sprague Dawley rats in Connecticut in 1998. They also suffer from severe kidney problems.

=== Lewis rat ===
The Lewis rat was developed by Margaret Lewis from Wistar stock in the early 1950s. Characteristics include albino coloring, docile behavior, and low fertility. The Lewis rat suffers from several spontaneous pathologies: first, they can suffer from high incidences of neoplasms, with the rat's lifespan mainly determined by this. The most common are adenomas of the pituitary and adenomas/adenocarcinomas of the adrenal cortex in both sexes, mammary gland tumors and endometrial carcinomas in females, and C-cell adenomas/adenocarcinomas of the thyroid gland and tumors of the hematopoietic system in males. Second, Lewis rats are prone to develop a spontaneous transplantable lymphatic leukaemia. Lastly, when in advanced age, they sometimes develop spontaneous glomerular sclerosis.

Research applications include transplantation research, induced arthritis and inflammation, experimental allergic encephalitis, and STZ-induced diabetes.

=== Royal College of Surgeons rat ===
A Royal College of Surgeons rat undergoing visual acuity testing

The Royal College of Surgeons rat (or RCS rat) is the first known animal with inherited retinal degeneration. Although the genetic defect was not known for many years, it was identified in the year 2000 as a mutation in the gene MERTK. This mutation results in defective retinal pigment epithelium phagocytosis of photoreceptor outer segments.

=== Shaking rat Kawasaki ===
The shaking rat Kawasaki (SRK) is an autosomal recessive mutant that has a short deletion in the RELN (reelin) gene. This results in the lowered expression of reelin protein, essential for proper cortex lamination and cerebellum development. Its phenotype is similar to the widely researched reeler mouse. Shaking rat Kawasaki was first described in 1988. This and the Lewis rat are well-known stocks developed from Wistar rats.

=== Zucker rat ===
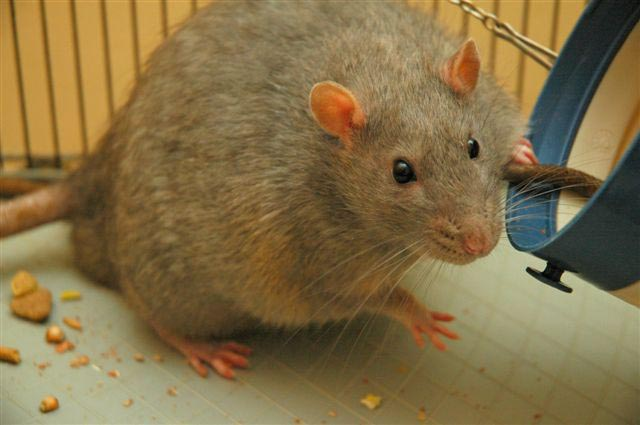
Zucker rat

The Zucker rat was bred to be a genetic model for research on obesity and hypertension. They are named after Lois M. Zucker and Theodore F. Zucker, pioneer researchers in the study of the genetics of obesity. There are two types of Zucker rat: a lean Zucker rat, denoted as the dominant trait (Fa/Fa) or (Fa/fa); and the characteristically obese (or fatty) Zucker rat or Zucker diabetic fatty rat (ZDF rat), which is actually a recessive trait (fa/fa) of the leptin receptor, capable of weighing up to 1 kilogram (2.2 lb) — more than twice the average weight.

Obese Zucker rats have high levels of lipids and cholesterol in their bloodstream, are resistant to insulin without being hyperglycemic, and gain weight from an increase in both the size and number of fat cells. Obesity in Zucker rats is primarily linked to their hyperphagic nature and excessive hunger; however, food intake does not fully explain the hyperlipidemia or overall body composition.

=== Knockout rats ===
A knockout rat (also spelled knock out or knock-out) is a genetically engineered rat with a single gene turned off through a targeted mutation. Knockout rats can mimic human diseases, and are important tools for studying gene function and for drug discovery and development. The production of knockout rats became technically feasible in 2008, through work financed by $120 million in funding from the National Institutes of Health (NIH) via the Rat Genome Sequencing Project Consortium, and work accomplished by the members of the Knock Out Rat Consortium (KORC). Knockout rat disease models for Parkinson's disease, Alzheimer's disease, hypertension, and diabetes, using zinc-finger nuclease technology, are being commercialized by SAGE Labs.

== See also ==
- Woolly mouse
- Laboratory mouse
- Animal testing on rodents
- Morris water maze
- Rat Genome Database
