= Knockout rat =

Type of genetically engineered rat

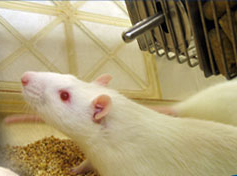

A knockout rat is a genetically engineered rat with a single gene turned off through a targeted mutation (gene trapping) used for academic and pharmaceutical research. Knockout rats can mimic human diseases and are important tools for studying gene function (functional genomics) and for drug discovery and development. The production of knockout rats was not economically or technically feasible until 2008.

Technology developed through funding from the National Institutes of Health (NIH) and work accomplished by the members of the Knock Out Rat Consortium (KORC) led to cost-effective methods to create knockout rats. The importance of developing the rat as a more versatile tool for human health research is evidenced by the $120 million investment made by the NIH via the Rat Genome Sequencing Project Consortium, resulting in the draft sequence of a laboratory strain of the brown or Norway rat (Rattus norvegicus). Additional developments with zinc finger nuclease technology in 2009 led to the first knockout rat with targeted, germline-transmitted mutations. Knockout rat disease models for Parkinson's, Alzheimer's, hypertension, and diabetes using zinc-finger nuclease technology are being commercialized by SAGE Labs.

== Research use ==
Mice, rats, and humans share all but approximately 1% of each other's genes making rodents good model organisms for studying human gene function. Both mice and rats are relatively small, easily handled, have a short generation time, and are genetically inbred. While mice have proven to be a useful rodent model and techniques have been developed for routine disruption of their genes, in many circumstances rats are considered a superior laboratory animal for studying and modeling human disease.

Rats are physiologically more similar to humans than are mice. For example, rats have a heart rate more similar to that of humans, while mice have a heart rate five to ten times as fast. It is widely believed that the rat is a better model than the mouse for human cardiovascular disease, diabetes, arthritis, and many autoimmune, neurological, behavioral, and addiction disorders. In addition, rat models are superior to mouse models for testing the pharmacodynamics and toxicity of potential therapeutic compounds, partially because the number and type of many of their detoxifying enzymes are very similar to those in humans. Their larger size makes rats more conducive to study by instrumentation, and also facilitates manipulation such as blood sampling, nerve conduction, and performing surgeries.

Techniques for genetic manipulation are available in the mouse, which is commonly used to model human disease. Although published knockouts exist for approximately 60% of mouse genes, a large majority of common human diseases do not have a knockout mouse model. Knockout rat models are an alternative to mice that may enable the creation of new gene disruptions that are unavailable in the mouse. Knockout rat models can also complement existing transgenic mouse models. Comparing mouse and rat mutants can facilitate the distinction between rodent-specific and general mammalian phenotypes.

== Production challenges ==
Rat models have been used to advance many areas of medical research, including cardiovascular disease, psychiatric disorders (studies of behavioral intervention and addiction), neural regeneration, diabetes, transplantation, autoimmune disorders (rheumatoid arthritis), cancer, and wound & bone healing. While the completion of the rat genome sequence provides very key information, how these diseases relate to gene function requires an efficient method to create knockout rat models in which specific genomic sequences are manipulated. Most techniques for genetic manipulation, including random mutagenesis with a gene trap (retroviral-based and non-retroviral-based), gene knock-outs/knock-ins, and conditional mutations, depend upon the culture and manipulation of embryonic stem (ES) cells. Rat ES cells were only recently isolated and no demonstration of gene modification in them has been reported. Consequently, many genetic manipulation techniques widely used in the mouse are not possible in the rat.

== Early methods ==
Until the commercial development of mobile DNA technology in 2007 and zinc-finger nuclease technology in 2009, there were only two technologies that could be used to produce rat models of human disease: cloning and chemical mutagenesis using N-ethyl-N-nitrosourea (ENU). Although cloning by somatic cell nuclear transfer (SCNT) could theoretically be used to create rats with specific mutations by mutating somatic cells, and then using these cells for SCNT, this approach has not been used successfully to create knockout rats. One problem with this strategy is that SCNT is extremely inefficient. The first published attempt had a success rate of less than 1%. Alternatively, ENU mutagenesis is a common random mutagenesis gene knockout strategy in the mouse that can also be used in the rat. ENU mutagenesis involves using a chemical, N-ethyl-N-nitrosourea (ENU), to create single base changes in the genome. ENU transfers its ethyl group to oxygen or nitrogen radicals in DNA, resulting in mis-pairing and base pair substitution. Mutant animals can be produced by injecting a male mouse with ENU, and breeding with a wild type female to produce mutant offspring. ENU mutagenesis creates a high frequency of random mutations, with approximately one base pair change in any given gene in every 200-700 gametes. Despite its high mutagenicity, the physical penetration of ENU is limited and only about 500 genes are mutated for each male and a very small number of the total mutations have an observable phenotype. Thousands of mutations typically need to be created in a single animal in order to generate one novel phenotype.

Despite recent improvements in ENU technology, mapping mutations responsible for a particular phenotype is typically difficult and time-consuming. Neutral mutations must be separated from causative mutations, via extensive breeding. ENU and cloning methods are simply inefficient for creating and mapping gene knockouts in rats for the creation of new models of human disease. Through 2007, the largest rat ENU mutagenesis project to date run by the Medical College of Wisconsin was able to produce only 9 knockout rat lines in a period of five years at an average cost of $200,000 per knockout line. Although some companies are still pursuing this strategy, the Medical College of Wisconsin has switched to a more efficient and commercially viable method using mobile DNA and CompoZr ZFN technology.

== Zinc-finger and TALE nuclease technology ==
Zinc finger nucleases (ZFNs) , are chimeric nucleases composed of two main components. The first consists of 3 to 4 zinc finger domains, while the second corresponds to the nuclease domain of the FokI endonuclease. When two ZFN subunits come close together and dimerize, their identical nuclease domains induce a double-strand break in the DNA, and Transcription Activator-Like Effector Nucleases (TALENs) are engineered DNA-binding proteins that facilitate targeted editing of the genome by creating double-strand breaks in DNA at user-specified locations. Double strand breaks are important for site-specific mutagenesis in that they stimulate the cell's natural DNA-repair processes, namely homologous recombination and non-homologous end joining. When the cell uses the non-homologous end joining pathway to repair the double-strand break, the inherent inaccuracy of the repair often generates precisely targeted mutations. This results in embryos with targeted gene knockout. Standard microinjection techniques allow this technology to make knockout rats in 4–6 months. A major advantage of ZFN- and TALEN-mediated gene knockout relative to the use of mobile DNA is that a particular gene can be uniquely and specifically targeted for knockout. In contrast, knockouts made using mobile DNA technology are random and are therefore unlikely to target the gene of interest.

== Mobile DNA technology ==
Mobile DNA (jumping gene) technology uses retrotransposons and transposons for the production of knockout rat models. This platform technology meets all of the criteria for a successful gene knockout approach in mammals by permitting random mutagenesis directly in the germ cells (sperm and oocytes) of mammalian model organisms, including rats. Using this technology, genes are disrupted completely and in a stable manner, are knocked out at a high frequency, and are randomly disrupted throughout the entire genome. The genomic location of mutations can be easily mapped, creating a library of knockout rats for later use. Once the random knockout mutations are created, more refined mutations such as conditional mutations can be created by breeding knockout lines with rat lines expressing CRE recombinase in a tissue specific manner. Knock-ins can be produced by recombination mediated cassette exchange.

== piggyBac (PB) DNA transposons ==
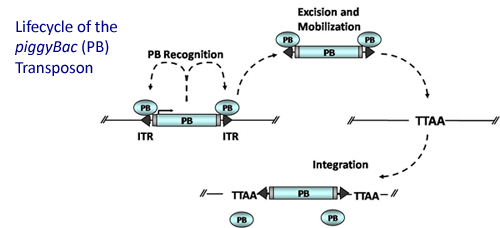
piggyBac transposon technology

piggyBac (PB) DNA transposons mobilize via a "cut-and-paste" mechanism whereby a transposase enzyme (PB transposase), encoded by the transposon itself, excises and re-integrates the transposon at other sites within the genome. PB transposase specifically recognizes PB inverted terminal repeats (ITRs) that flank the transposon; it binds to these sequences and catalyzes excision of the transposon. PB then integrates at TTAA sites throughout the genome, in a relatively random fashion. For the creation of gene trap mutations (or adapted for generating transgenic animals), the transposase is supplied in trans on one plasmid and is co-transfected with a plasmid containing donor transposon, a recombinant transposon comprising a gene trap flanked by the binding sites for the transposase (ITRs). The transposase will catalyze the excision of the transposon from the plasmid and subsequent integration into the genome. Integration within a coding region will capture the elements necessary for gene trap expression. PB possesses several ideal properties: (1) it preferentially inserts within genes (50 to 67% of insertions hit genes) (2) it exhibits no local hopping (widespread genomic coverage) (3) it is not sensitive to over-production inhibition in which elevated levels of the transposase cause decreased transposition 4) it excises cleanly from a donor site, leaving no "footprint", unlike Sleeping Beauty.

== Sleeping beauty (SB) transposons ==
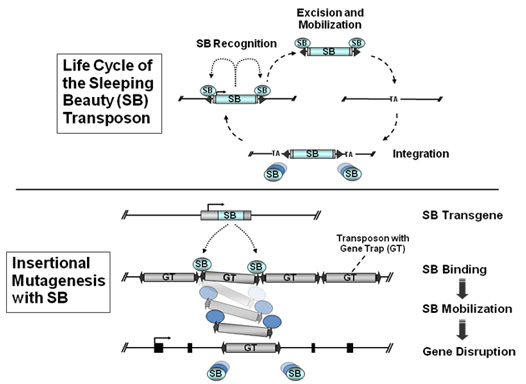
Sleeping Beauty transposon technology

The sleeping beauty (SB) transposon is a derivative of the Tc1/mariner superfamily of DNA transposons prevalent among both vertebrate and invertebrate genomes. However, endogenous DNA transposons from this family are completely inactive in vertebrate genomes. An active Tc1/mariner transposon, synthesized from alignment of inactive transposons from the salmonid subfamily of elements, was "awoken" to form the transposon named Sleeping Beauty. SB, like other DNA transposons, mobilizes itself via a cut-and-paste mechanism whereby a transposase enzyme, encoded by the transposon itself, excises and re-integrates the transposon at other sites within the genome. The 340 amino acid SB protein recognizes inverted terminal repeats (ITRs) that flank the transposon; it binds to these sequences and catalyzes excision of the transposon. SB then integrates into random sites within the genome, although some studies report very slight preferences for transcriptional units. There is also a simple requirement of a TA-dinucleotide at the target site, like all Tc1/mariner transposons.

The SB transposon is a powerful tool for insertional mutagenesis in many vertebrate species. It recently exhibited especial utility for germ line mutagenesis in both mice and rats. There are several advantages that make SB a highly attractive mutagen geared toward gene discovery: 1) it has little bias for inserting within particular genomic regions or within specific recognition sequences, 2) de novo insertions of the transposon provide a "tagged" sequence marker for rapid identification of the specific mutation by simple PCR cloning methods, 3) in vivo SB insertional mutagenesis allows multiple mutations to be quickly and easily generated in a single animal, and in a single tissue, such as an adenomatous polyp.

== LINE1 (L1) retrotransposons ==
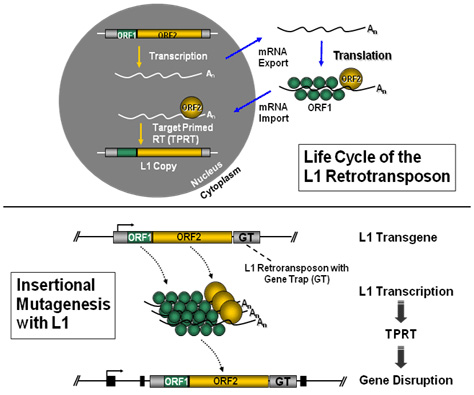
L1 retrotransposon technology

Transposons and retrotransposons are valuable tools for unbiased gene discovery as mobile pieces of DNA used for gene disruption. Retrotransposons, such as LINEs (long interspersed nuclear elements), mobilize via a "copy and paste" mechanism and are abundant in many eukaryotic species. Several L1 retrotransposons have remained active in mice and humans. L1s contain a small internal promoter within a 5′ untranslated region to drive expression, two open reading frames (ORFs), and a 3′ untranslated region containing sequences for polyadenylation. The two ORFs encode proteins necessary for autonomous retrotransposition; ORF1 encodes an RNA-binding protein while ORF2 encodes a protein containing endonuclease (EN) and reverse transcriptase (RT) activity, which nick a site in DNA, then produce a copy via RT. These proteins exhibit an overwhelming specificity for binding to and acting on the transcript that encodes them, enabling near exclusive mobilization of the parental L1 RNA. Using the RT activity of the ORF2 protein, the transcribed L1 RNA is copied into DNA by a process termed target primed reverse transcription (TPRT), and integrated into the genome. Integration occurs with little bias for any particular genomic region, requiring a simple consensus sequence, 5′TTTT′A-3′ (along with minor variations of this sequence). Integrated L1 sequences are often truncated at the 5′ end, with an average total size of 1 Kb, many containing only 3′ terminal sequences.

The nature of retrotransposition endows the L1 with some unique advantages; L1 retrotransposons have an essentially unlimited supply of the insertional mutagen since it is continually transcribed from a promoter, which would be useful for applications where large numbers of mutations are needed in a single cell. L1 elements also demonstrate widespread genomic coverage, with a largely random distribution of insertions. L1 insertions at genomic sites are also irreversible, and thus any mutagenic event caused by an L1 insertion is "tagged" by L1 sequences.

== See also ==
- Biobreeding rat
- Genetics
- Gene knockout
- Lab animals
- Transgenic animal
