= Zinc finger nuclease treatment of HIV =

Experimental gene therapy

Since antiretroviral therapy requires a lifelong treatment regimen, research to find more permanent cures for HIV infection is currently underway. It is possible to synthesize zinc finger nucleotides with zinc finger components that selectively (almost selectively) bind to specific portions of DNA. Conceptually, targeting and editing could focus on host cellular co-receptors for HIV or on proviral HIV DNA.

== Host cellular co-receptors for HIV ==
It has also been observed that 20% of the Caucasian population possess a mutation, called CCR5-Δ32 (frequency of 0.0808 for homozygous allele), that prevents the CCR5 chemokine receptor protein, which is the main means of viral access into the cell, from being expressed on the surface of their CD4^{+} T-cells. Individuals who are homozygous for this mutation are immune to HIV strains that use the CCR5 receptor to access the cell, while those that are heterozygous for this mutation have been found to reduce plasma viral load and delay progression of AIDS. By combining these facts, researchers have proposed a novel method of treatment for HIV. This method attempts to treat the infection by disrupting the CCR5 gene, such as introducing the CCR5-Δ32 mutation using a recombinant adenoviral vector or forcing DNA repair by nonhomologous end joining, which is prone to error and results in a non-functional gene. As a consequence, resulting in the expression of nonfunctional CCR5 co-receptors on CD4^{+} T cells, providing immunity against infection.

The zinc finger nucleases that have been synthesized for this treatment are manufactured by combining FokI Type II restriction endonucleases with engineered zinc fingers. The number of zinc fingers attached to the endonuclease controls the specificity of the ZFN since they are engineered to preferentially bind to specific base sequences in DNA. Each ZFN is made up of multiple zinc fingers and one nuclease enzyme.

== Proviral HIV DNA ==
A recent and unique application of ZFN-technology to treat HIV has emerged whose focus is to target not the host genome, but rather proviral HIV DNA, for mutagenesis. The authors of this work have drawn their inspiration from the innate defense mechanism against bacteria-infecting-viruses called bacteriophages, present amongst those bacteria endowed with restriction modification (R-M) systems. These bacteria secrete a restriction enzyme (REase) that recognizes and repetitively cleaves around palindromic sequences within the xenogenic DNAs of the bacteriophages or simply phages, until the same is disabled. Further support for this approach resides in the fact that, the human genome comprises in large part remnants of retroviral genomes that have been inactivated by several mechanisms, some of whose action resembles that of ZFN. It should not be surprising, therefore, that the initial work leading to the application of ZFN technology in this manner revolved around and involved the isolation and testing of HIV/SIV targeting bacteria-derived REases, whose non-specificity (due to their short recognition sequences) unfortunately, rendered them toxic to the host genome. The latter-potential host-genome toxicity posed by the raw bacteria-derived REases limited their application to ex-vivo modalities for HIV prevention, namely synthetic or live microbicides. Subsequently, however, the unique specificity offered by ZFNs was quickly recognized and harnessed, paving way for a novel strategy for attacking HIV in-vivo (through target mutagenesis of proviral HIV DNA) that is similar to the manner by which bacteria equipped with R-M systems do, to disable the foreign DNAs of in-coming phage-genomes. Because latent proviral HIV DNA resident in resting memory CD4 cells forms the major barrier to the eradication of HIV by highly active antiviral therapy (HAART), it is speculated that this approach may offer a 'functional cure" for HIV. Both ex-vivo (manipulation of stem or autologous T cell precursors) and in-vivo delivery platforms are being explored. It is also hoped that, when applied to non-HIV infected persons, this strategy could offer a genomic vaccine against HIV and other viruses. Similar work is ongoing for high-risk HPVs (with the intent of reversing cervical neoplasia) as well as with HSV-2 (with the goal of achieving a complete cure for genital herpes)

== Zinc finger binding ==
The FokI catalytic domain must dimerize to cleave the DNA at the targeted site, and requires there to be two adjacent zinc finger nucleases (see picture), which independently bind to a specific codon at the correct orientation and spacing. As a result, the two binding events from the two zinc finger nuclease enables specific DNA targeting. Specificity of genome editing is important for the zinc finger nuclease to be a successful application. The consequence of off-targeting cleavage can lead to a decrease in efficiency of the on-target modification in addition to other unwanted changes.

The exact constitution of the ZFNs that are to be used to treat HIV is still unknown. The binding of ZFNs for the alteration of the Zif268 genelink, however, has been well-studied and is outlined below to illustrate the mechanism by which the zinc finger domain of ZFNs bind to DNA.

The amino terminus of the alpha helix portion of zinc fingers targets the major grooves of the DNA helix and binds near the CCR5 gene positioning FokI in a suitable location for DNA cleavage.

Zinc fingers are repeated structural protein motifs with DNA recognition function that fit in the major grooves of DNA. Three zinc fingers are positioned in a semi-circular or C-shaped arrangement. Each zinc finger is made up of anti-parallel beta sheets and an alpha helix, held together by a zinc ion and hydrophobic residues.

The zinc atom is constrained in a tetrahedral conformation through the coordination of Cys3, Cys6, His19, and His23 and Zinc – Sulfur bond distance of 2.30 +/- 0.05 Angstroms and Zinc – Nitrogen bond distances of 2.0 +/- 0.05 Angstroms.

Each zinc finger has an arginine (arg) amino acid protruding from the alpha helix, which forms a hydrogen bond with Nitrogen 7 and Oxygen 6 of the guanine (gua) that is located at the 3' end of the binding site. The arg-gua bond is stabilized by aspartic acid from a 2nd residue, which positions the long chain of arginine through a hydrogen bond salt bridge interaction.

In residue 3 of the 2nd (i.e., middle) zinc finger, histidine49 forms a hydrogen bond with a co-planar guanine in base pair 6. The stacking of Histidine against Thymine in base pair 5 limits the conformational ability of Histidine49 leading to increased specificity for the histidine-guanine hydrogen bond.

At the 6th residue, fingers 1 and 3 have arginine donating a pair of charged hydrogen bonds to Nitrogen 7 and Oxygen 6 of guanine at the 5' end enhancing the site recognition sequence of zinc fingers.

=== Contacts with DNA backbone ===
The histidine coordinated to the zinc atom, which is also the seventh residue in the alpha helix of the zinc fingers, coordinates the Zinc ion through its Nε and hydrogen bonds with phosphodiester oxygen through Nδ on the primary DNA strand.

In addition to histidine, a conserved arginine on the second beta strand of the zinc fingers makes contact with the phosphodiester oxygen on the DNA strand.

Also serine 75 on the third finger hydrogen bonds to the phosphate between base pairs 7 and 8, as the only backbone contact with the secondary strand of DNA.

== Nuclease dimerization and cleavage ==
It has been discovered that FokI has no intrinsic specificity in its cleavage of DNA and that the zinc finger recognition domain confers selectivity to zinc finger nucleases.

Specificity is provided by dimerization, which decreases the probability of off-site cleavage. Each set of zinc fingers is specific to a nucleotide sequence on either side of the targeted gene 5-7 bp separation between nuclease components.

The dimerization of two ZFNs is required to produce the necessary double-strand break within the CCR5 gene because the interaction between the FokI enzyme and DNA is weak. This break is repaired by the natural repair mechanisms of the cell, specifically non-homologous end joining.

== Introducing the CCR5 mutation ==
Introducing genome alterations depends upon either of the two natural repair mechanisms of a cell: non-homologous end joining (NHEJ) and homology-directed repair (HDR). Repair through NHEJ comes about by the ligation of the end of the broken strands and, upon the occurrence of an error, can produce small insertions and deletions. HDR, on the other hand, uses a homologous DNA strand to repair—and gene making use of this repair mechanism and providing the desired nucleotide sequence allows for gene insertion or modification.

In the absence of a homologous nucleotide base sequence that can be used by a homologous recombination mechanism, the main DSB repair pathway in mammals is through non-homologous end joining (NHEJ). NHEJ, although capable of restoring a damaged gene, is error-prone. DSB are, therefore, introduced into the gene until an error in its repair occurs at which point ZFNs are no longer able to bind and dimerize and the mutation is complete. To accelerate this process, exonucleases can be introduced to digest the ends of the strands generated at DSBs.

== Limitations ==
Increasing the number of zinc fingers increases the specificity by increasing the number of base pairs that the ZFN can bind to. However too many zinc fingers can lead to off-target binding and thus offsite cleavage. This is due to an increased likelihood of zinc fingers binding to parts of the genome outside of the gene of interest.

Current ZFN treatments focus on the CCR5 gene as no known side effects result from altering CCR5. There are strains of HIV that are able to use CXCR4 to enter the host cell, bypassing CCR5 altogether. The same gene editing technology has been applied to CXCR4 alone and in combination with CCR5

Several issues exist with this experimental treatment. One issue lies in ensuring that the desired repair mechanism is the one that is used to repair the DSB following gene addition. Another issue with the disruption of the CCR5 gene is that CXCR4-specific or dual-tropic strains are still able to access the cell. This method can prevent the progression of HIV infection.

To employ the ZFNs in clinical settings the following criteria must be met:

i) High specificity of DNA-binding – Correlates with better performance and less toxicity of ZFNs. Engineered ZFNs take into account positional and context-dependent effects of zinc fingers to increase specificity.

ii) Enable allosteric activation of FokI once bound to DNA in order for it to produce only the required DSB.

iii) To deliver two different zinc finger nuclease subunits and donor DNA to the cell, the vectors that are used need to be improved to decrease the risk of mutagenesis. These include adeno-associated virus vectors, integrase-deficient lentiviral vectors and adenovirus type 5 vectors.

iv) Transient expression of ZFNs is preferred over permanent expression of these proteins to avoid 'off-target' effects.

v) During gene targeting, genotoxicity associated with high expression of ZFNs might lead to cell apoptosis and thus needs to be thoroughly verified in vitro and in vivo transformation assays.

== Administration of treatment ==
The cells in which the mutations are induced ex vivo are filtered out from lymphocytes by apheresis to produce analogous lentiviral engineered CD4^{+} T-cells. These are re-infused into the body as a single dose of 1 X 10^{10} gene modified analogous CD4^{+} T-cells. A viral vector is used to deliver the ZFNs that induce the desired mutation into the cells. Conditions that promote this process are carefully monitored ensuring the production of CCR5 strain HIV-resistant T cells.

=== The Berlin Patient ===
Timothy Ray Brown, who underwent a bone marrow transplant in 2007 to treat leukemia, had HIV simultaneously. Soon after the operation the HIV dropped to undetectable levels. This is a result of the bone marrow donor being homozygous for the CCR5-Δ32 mutation. This new mutation conferred a resistance to HIV in the recipient, eventually leading to an almost complete disappearance of HIV particles in his body. After nearly 2 years without antiretroviral drug therapy, HIV could still not be detected in any of his tissues. Though this method has been effective at reducing the level of infection, the risks associated with bone marrow transplants outweighs its potential value as a treatment for HIV.
