= Transcription activator-like effector nuclease =

Enzymes that cleave DNA in specific ways

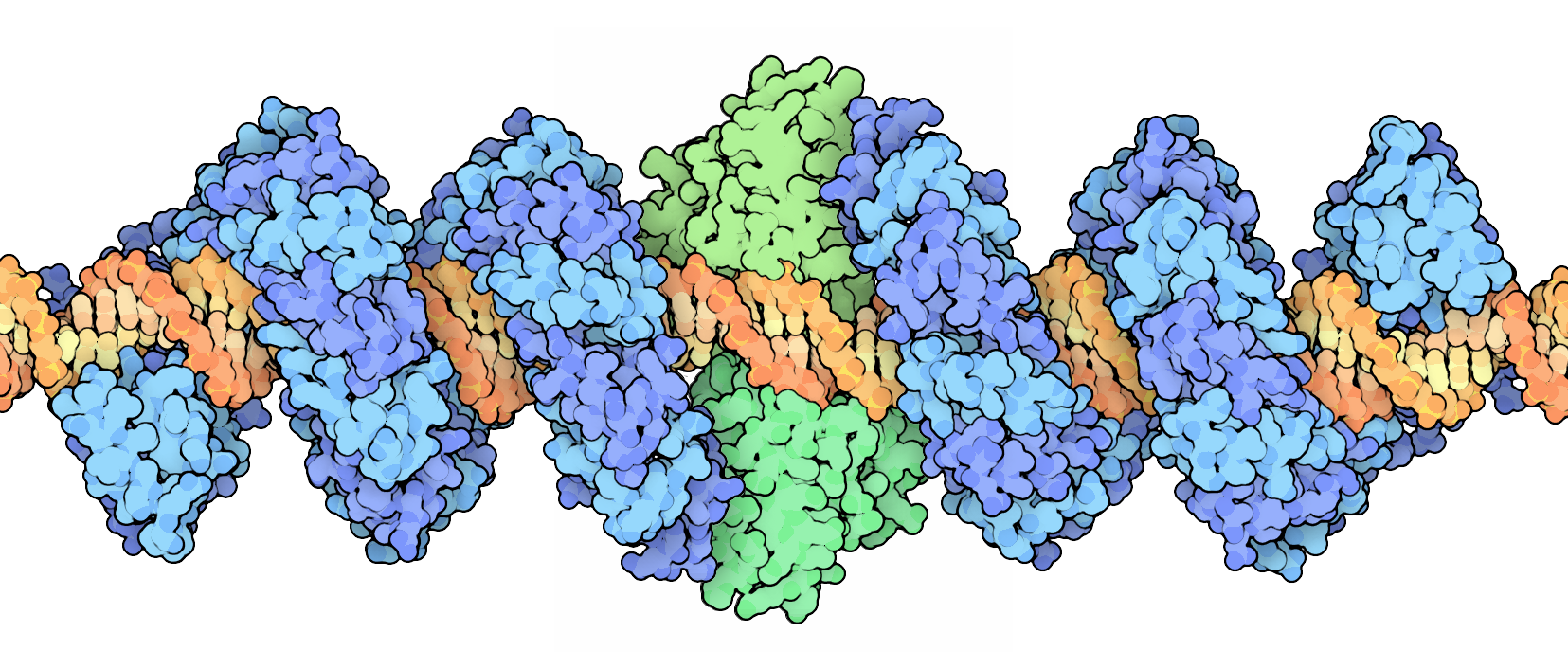
Spacefill drawing of dimeric TALE-FokI fusion (blue: TALE; green: FokI) bound to DNA (PDB: 1FOK, 3UGM), by David Goodsell

Transcription activator-like effector nucleases (TALEN) are restriction enzymes that can be engineered to cut specific sequences of DNA. They are made by fusing a TAL effector DNA-binding domain to a DNA cleavage domain (a nuclease which cuts DNA strands). Transcription activator-like effectors (TALEs) can be engineered to bind to practically any desired DNA sequence, so when combined with a nuclease, DNA can be cut at specific locations. The restriction enzymes can be introduced into cells, for use in gene editing or for genome editing in situ, a technique known as genome editing with engineered nucleases. Alongside zinc-finger nucleases and CRISPR/Cas9, TALEN is a prominent tool in the field of genome editing.

== TALE DNA-binding domain ==
TAL effectors are proteins that are secreted by Xanthomonas bacteria via their type III secretion system when they infect plants. The DNA binding domain contains a repeated highly conserved 33–34 amino acid sequence with divergent 12th and 13th amino acids. These two positions, referred to as the Repeat Variable Diresidue (RVD), are highly variable and show a strong correlation with specific nucleotide recognition. This straightforward relationship between amino acid sequence and DNA recognition has allowed for the engineering of specific DNA-binding domains by selecting a combination of repeat segments containing the appropriate RVDs. Notably, slight changes in the RVD and the incorporation of "nonconventional" RVD sequences can improve targeting specificity.

== DNA cleavage domain ==
The non-specific DNA cleavage domain from the end of the FokI endonuclease can be used to construct hybrid nucleases that are active in a yeast assay. These reagents are also active in plant cells and in animal cells. Initial TALEN studies used the wild-type FokI cleavage domain, but some subsequent TALEN studies also used FokI cleavage domain variants with mutations designed to improve cleavage specificity and cleavage activity. The FokI domain functions as a dimer, requiring two constructs with unique DNA binding domains for sites in the target genome with proper orientation and spacing. Both the number of amino acid residues between the TALE DNA binding domain and the FokI cleavage domain and the number of bases between the two individual TALEN binding sites appear to be important parameters for achieving high levels of activity.

== Engineering TALEN constructs ==
The simple relationship between amino acid sequence and DNA recognition of the TALE binding domain allows for the efficient engineering of proteins. In this case, artificial gene synthesis is problematic because of improper annealing of the repetitive sequence found in the TALE binding domain. One solution to this is to use a publicly available software program (DNAWorks) to calculate oligonucleotides suitable for assembly in a two step PCR oligonucleotide assembly followed by whole gene amplification. A number of modular assembly schemes for generating engineered TALE constructs have also been reported. Both methods offer a systematic approach to engineering DNA binding domains that is conceptually similar to the modular assembly method for generating zinc finger DNA recognition domains.

Workflow of genome editing of Your Favorite Gene (YFG) using TALEN. The target sequence is identified, a corresponding TALEN sequence is engineered and inserted into a plasmid. The plasmid is inserted into the target cell where it is translated to produce the functional TALEN, which enters the nucleus and binds and cleaves the target sequence. Depending on the application, this can be used to introduce an error (to knock out a target gene) or to introduce a new DNA sequence into the target gene.

== Transfection ==
Once the TALEN constructs have been assembled, they are inserted into plasmids; the target cells are then transfected with the plasmids, and the gene products are expressed and enter the nucleus to access the genome. Alternatively, TALEN constructs can be delivered to the cells as mRNAs, which removes the possibility of genomic integration of the TALEN-expressing protein. Using an mRNA vector can also dramatically increase the level of homology directed repair (HDR) and the success of introgression during gene editing.

== Genome editing ==
=== Mechanisms ===
TALEN can be used to edit genomes by inducing double-strand breaks (DSB), which cells respond to with repair mechanisms.

Non-homologous end joining (NHEJ) directly ligates DNA from either side of a double-strand break where there is very little or no sequence overlap for annealing. This repair mechanism induces errors in the genome via indels (insertion or deletion), or chromosomal rearrangement; any such errors may render the gene products coded at that location non-functional. Because this activity can vary depending on the species, cell type, target gene, and nuclease used, it should be monitored when designing new systems. A simple heteroduplex cleavage assay can be run which detects any difference between two alleles amplified by PCR. Cleavage products can be visualized on simple agarose gels or slab gel systems.

Alternatively, DNA can be introduced into a genome through NHEJ in the presence of exogenous double-stranded DNA fragments.

Homology directed repair can also introduce foreign DNA at the DSB as the transfected double-stranded sequences are used as templates for the repair enzymes.

=== Applications ===
TALEN has been used to efficiently modify plant genomes, creating economically important food crops with favorable nutritional qualities. They have also been harnessed to develop tools for the production of biofuels. In addition, it has been used to engineer stably modified human embryonic stem cell and induced pluripotent stem cell (IPSCs) clones and human erythroid cell lines, to generate knockout C. elegans, knockout rats, knockout mice, and knockout zebrafish. Moreover, the method can be used to generate knockin organisms. Wu et al.obtained a Sp110 knockin cattle using Talen nickases to induce increased resistance of tuberculosis. This approach has also been used to generate knockin rats by TALEN mRNA microinjection in one-cell embryos.

TALEN has also been utilized experimentally to correct the genetic errors that underlie disease. For example, it has been used in vitro to correct the genetic defects that cause disorders such as sickle cell disease, xeroderma pigmentosum, and epidermolysis bullosa. Recently, it was shown that TALEN can be used as tools to harness the immune system to fight cancers; TALEN-mediated targeting can generate T cells that are resistant to chemotherapeutic drugs and show anti-tumor activity.

In theory, the genome-wide specificity of engineered TALEN fusions allows for correction of errors at individual genetic loci via homology-directed repair from a correct exogenous template. In reality, however, the in situ application of TALEN is currently limited by the lack of an efficient delivery mechanism, unknown immunogenic factors, and uncertainty in the specificity of TALEN binding.

Another emerging application of TALEN is its ability to combine with other genome engineering tools, such as meganucleases. The DNA binding region of a TAL effector can be combined with the cleavage domain of a meganuclease to create a hybrid architecture combining the ease of engineering and highly specific DNA binding activity of a TAL effector with the low site frequency and specificity of a meganuclease.

In comparison to other genome editing techniques, TALEN falls in the middle in terms of difficulty and cost. Unlike ZFNs, TALEN recognizes single nucleotides. It's far more straightforward to engineer interactions between TALEN DNA binding domains and their target nucleotides than it is to create interactions with ZFNs and their target nucleotide triplets. On the other hand, CRISPR relies on ribonucleotide complex formation instead of protein/DNA recognition. gRNAs have occasionally limitations regarding feasibility due to lack of PAM sites in the target sequence and even though they can be cheaply produced, the current development lead to a remarkable decrease of cost for TALENs, so that they are in a similar price and time range like CRISPR based genome editing.

== TAL effector nuclease precision ==
The off-target activity of an active nuclease may lead to unwanted double-strand breaks and may consequently yield chromosomal rearrangements and/or cell death. Studies have been carried out to compare the relative nuclease-associated toxicity of available technologies. Based on these studies and the maximal theoretical distance between DNA binding and nuclease activity, TALEN constructs are believed to have the greatest precision of the currently available technologies.

== See also ==
- Genome editing with engineered nucleases
- Zinc finger nuclease
- Meganuclease
- CRISPR
- HT-TALENS - an engineered plant protein that is a proposed cure for HIV
