= NgAgo =

NgAgo is a single-stranded DNA (ssDNA)-guided Argonaute endonuclease, an acronym for Natronobacterium gregoryi Argonaute. NgAgo binds 5′ phosphorylated ssDNA of ~24 nucleotides (gDNA) to guide it to its target site and will make DNA double-strand breaks at the gDNA site. Like the CRISPR/Cas system, NgAgo was reported by Chunyu Han et al. to be suitable for genome editing, but this has not been replicated. In contrast to Cas9, the NgAgo–gDNA system does not require a protospacer adjacent motif (PAM).

== Role ==
NgAgo was proposed to be useful for genome editing in May 2016 because of the system’s high accuracy and efficiency, which was said to minimize off-target effects. The specificity of the gDNA is essential, as cleavage efficiency is impaired by a single nucleotide mismatch between the guide and target molecules. Using 5’ phosphorylated ssDNAs as guide molecules reduces the possibility of cellular oligonucleotides misleading NgAgo. A guide molecule can only be attached to NgAgo during the expression of the protein. Once the guide is loaded, NgAgo cannot swap free floating ssDNA for its gDNA. Designing, synthesizing, and adjusting the concentration of ssDNAs is easier compared to systems using sgRNA. The required dosage of ssDNA is less than that of a sgRNA expression plasmid.

== Controversy ==
Doubts about the technique were raised on gene editing forums as early as June and have persisted. There have been several allegations that this procedure is impossible to reproduce. Nature Biotechnology, which originally published the research, is investigating. In November 2016, a letter was published in Protein & Cell questioning the research and the lead author's claim that replication requires "superb experimental skill". The same month, Nature Biotechnology published a critical correspondence article by three groups and an accompanying expression of concern by the editors on the original article. The authors retracted the study in a statement published in Nature Biotechnology on 3 August 2017, citing the continued inability of the research community to replicate their results. In 2018, an investigation led by Han's university concluded that while Han's findings were flawed, he and his team did not intend to deceive the scientific community. In April 2019, a preprint article found that NgAgo does have the ability to edit genes and implied that previous results might have been difficult to reproduce due to difficulties related to purification of the active protein.
