= Chimeric nuclease =

Chimeric nucleases are an example of engineered proteins which must comprise a DNA-binding domain to give sequence specificity and a nuclease domain for DNA cleavage.

== DNA-binding domains ==
DNA-binding domains including the basic helix-loop-helix, zinc finger, helix-turn-helix and leucine zipper motifs have been used in construction of sequence-specific nucleases. Of these, zinc fingers have been suggested the most important due to their modularity, allowing construction of a tailor-made DNA-binding domain.

== Nuclease domain ==
The nuclease domain is responsible for physical cleavage of DNA strands and may introduce either single stranded or double-stranded breaks. FokI is an example of a sequence-specific endonuclease whose non-specific nuclease domain introduces double stranded breaks and has been used in a variety of experiments including identification of high- and low-affinity binding sites of transcription factors in vitro, to study recruitment of factors to promoter sites in vivo using protein position identification with a nuclease tail assay and to study proteins specific to interaction with DNA in the Z-DNA conformation (Durai et al., 2005 and references therein).

== See also ==
- Protein engineering
- Chimera (protein)
