= Zinc-finger nuclease =

Artificial enzymes

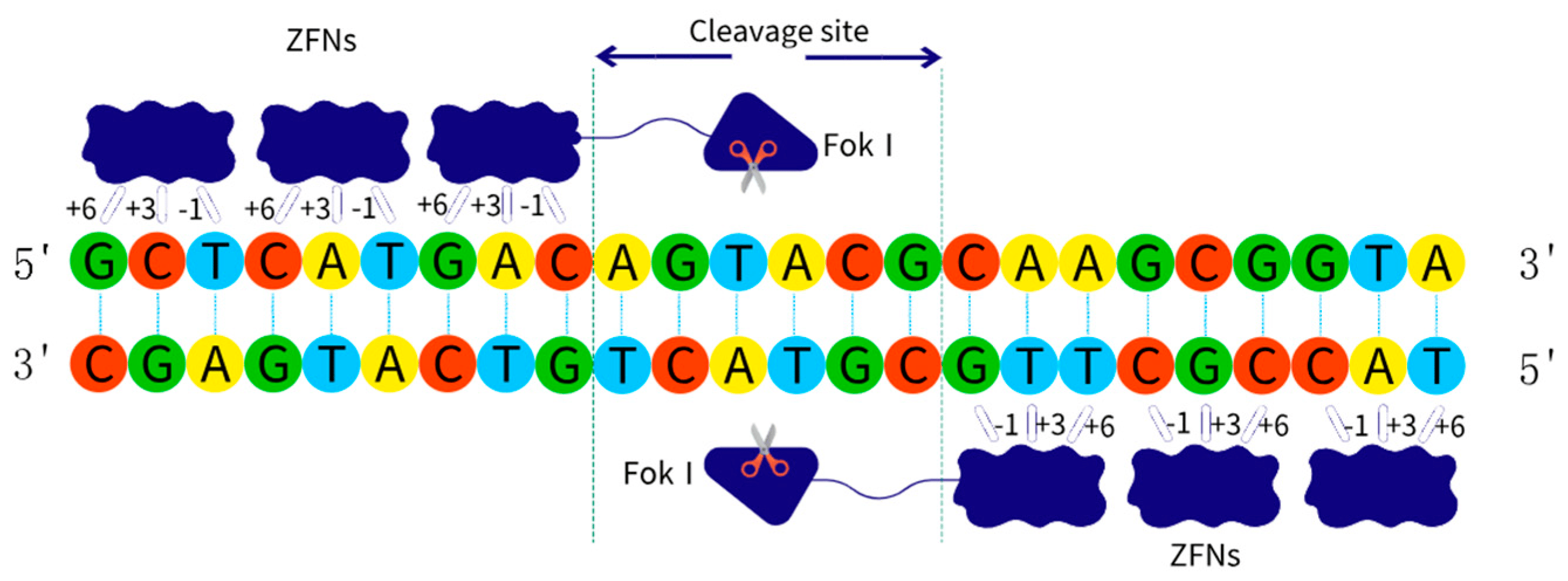
The schematic diagram of ZFNs

Zinc-finger nucleases (ZFNs) are artificial restriction enzymes generated by fusing a zinc finger DNA-binding domain to a DNA-cleavage domain. Zinc finger-domains can be engineered to target specific desired DNA sequences and this enables zinc-finger nucleases to target unique sequences within complex genomes. By taking advantage of endogenous DNA repair machinery, these reagents can be used to precisely alter the genomes of higher organisms. Alongside CRISPR/Cas9 and TALEN, ZFN is a prominent tool in the field of genome editing.

It was initially created by researcher Srinivasan Chandrasegaran.

== Domains ==
=== DNA-binding domain ===
The DNA-binding domains of individual ZFNs typically contain between three and six individual zinc finger repeats and can each recognize between 9 and 18 basepairs. If the zinc finger domains perfectly recognize a 3 basepair DNA sequence, they can generate a 3-finger array that can recognize a 9 basepair target site. Other procedures can utilize either 1-finger or 2-finger modules to generate zinc-finger arrays with six or more individual zinc fingers. The main drawback with this procedure is the specificities of individual zinc fingers can overlap and can depend on the context of the surrounding zinc fingers and DNA. Without methods to account for this "context dependence", the standard modular assembly procedure often fails.

Numerous selection methods have been used to generate zinc-finger arrays capable of targeting desired sequences. Initial selection efforts utilized phage display to select proteins that bound a given DNA target from a large pool of partially randomized zinc-finger arrays. More recent efforts have utilized yeast one-hybrid systems, bacterial one-hybrid and two-hybrid systems, and mammalian cells. A promising new method to select novel zinc-finger arrays utilizes a bacterial two-hybrid system and has been dubbed "OPEN" by its creators. This system combines pre-selected pools of individual zinc fingers that were each selected to bind a given triplet and then utilizes a second round of selection to obtain 3-finger arrays capable of binding a desired 9-bp sequence. This system was developed by the Zinc-Finger Consortium as an alternative to commercial sources of engineered zinc-finger arrays.

(see: Zinc finger chimera for more info on zinc finger selection techniques)

=== DNA-cleavage domain ===
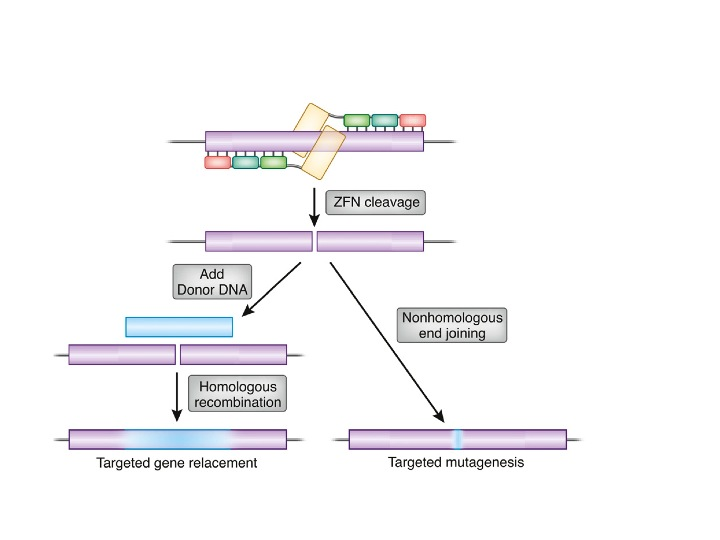
A pair of ZFNs, each with three zinc fingers binding to target DNA, are shown introducing a double-strand break, at the FokI domain, depicted in yellow. Subsequently, the double strand break is shown as being repaired through either homology-directed repair or non-homologous end joining.

The non-specific cleavage domain from the type IIs restriction endonuclease FokI is typically used as the cleavage domain in ZFNs. This cleavage domain must dimerize in order to cleave DNA and thus a pair of ZFNs are required to target non-palindromic DNA sites. Standard ZFNs fuse the cleavage domain to the C-terminus of each zinc finger domain. To let the two cleavage domains dimerize and cleave DNA, the two individual ZFNs must bind opposite strands of DNA with their C-termini a certain distance apart. The most commonly used linker sequences between the zinc finger domain and the cleavage domain requires the 5′ edge of each binding site to be separated by 5 to 7 bp.

Several different protein engineering techniques have been employed to improve both the activity and specificity of the nuclease domain used in ZFNs. Directed evolution has been employed to generate a FokI variant with enhanced cleavage activity that the authors dubbed "Sharkey". Structure-based design has also been employed to improve the cleavage specificity of FokI by modifying the dimerization interface so that only the intended heterodimeric species are active.

== Applications ==
Zinc finger nucleases are useful to manipulate the genomes of many plants and animals including arabidopsis, tobacco, soybean, corn, Drosophila melanogaster, C. elegans, Platynereis dumerilii, sea urchin, silkworm, zebrafish, frogs, mice, rats, rabbits, pigs, cattle, and various types of mammalian cells. Zinc finger nucleases have also been used in a mouse model of haemophilia and a clinical trial found CD4+ human T-cells with the CCR5 gene disrupted by zinc finger nucleases to be safe as a potential treatment for HIV/AIDS. ZFNs are also used to create a new generation of genetic disease models called isogenic human disease models.

=== Disabling an allele ===
ZFNs can be used to disable dominant mutations in heterozygous individuals by producing double-strand breaks (DSBs) in the DNA (see Genetic recombination) in the mutant allele, which will, in the absence of a homologous template, be repaired by non-homologous end-joining (NHEJ). NHEJ repairs DSBs by joining the two ends together and usually produces no mutations, provided that the cut is clean and uncomplicated. In some instances, however, the repair is imperfect, resulting in deletion or insertion of base-pairs, producing frame-shift and preventing the production of the harmful protein. Multiple pairs of ZFNs can also be used to completely remove entire large segments of genomic sequence. To monitor the editing activity, a PCR of the target area amplifies both alleles and, if one contains an insertion, deletion, or mutation, it results in a heteroduplex single-strand bubble that cleavage assays can easily detect. ZFNs have also been used to modify disease-causing alleles in triplet repeat disorders. Expanded CAG/CTG repeat tracts are the genetic basis for more than a dozen inherited neurological disorders including Huntington's disease, myotonic dystrophy, and several spinocerebellar ataxias. It has been demonstrated in human cells that ZFNs can direct double-strand breaks (DSBs) to CAG repeats and shrink the repeat from long pathological lengths to short, less toxic lengths.

Recently, a group of researchers have successfully applied the ZFN technology to genetically modify the gol pigment gene and the ntl gene in zebrafish embryo. Specific zinc-finger motifs were engineered to recognize distinct DNA sequences. The ZFN-encoding mRNA was injected into one-cell embryos and a high percentage of animals carried the desired mutations and phenotypes. Their research work demonstrated that ZFNs can specifically and efficiently create heritable mutant alleles at loci of interest in the germ line, and ZFN-induced alleles can be propagated in subsequent generations.

Similar research of using ZFNs to create specific mutations in zebrafish embryo has also been carried out by other research groups. The kdr gene in zebra fish encodes for the vascular endothelial growth factor-2 receptor. Mutagenic lesions at this target site was induced using ZFN technique by a group of researchers in US. They suggested that the ZFN technique allows straightforward generation of a targeted allelic series of mutants; it does not rely on the existence of species-specific embryonic stem cell lines and is applicable to other vertebrates, especially those whose embryos are easily available; finally, it is also feasible to achieve targeted knock-ins in zebrafish, therefore it is possible to create human disease models that are heretofore inaccessible.

=== Allele editing ===
ZFNs are also used to rewrite the sequence of an allele by invoking the homologous recombination (HR) machinery to repair the DSB using the supplied DNA fragment as a template. The HR machinery searches for homology between the damaged chromosome and the extra-chromosomal fragment and copies the sequence of the fragment between the two broken ends of the chromosome, regardless of whether the fragment contains the original sequence. If the subject is homozygous for the target allele, the efficiency of the technique is reduced since the undamaged copy of the allele may be used as a template for repair instead of the supplied fragment.

=== Gene therapy ===
The success of gene therapy depends on the efficient insertion of therapeutic genes at an appropriate chromosomal target site within the human genome, without causing cell injury, oncogenic mutations, or an immune response. The construction of plasmid vectors is simple and straightforward. Custom-designed ZFNs that combine the non-specific cleavage domain (N) of FokI endonuclease with zinc-finger proteins (ZFPs) offer a general way to deliver a site-specific DSB to the genome, and stimulate local homologous recombination by several orders of magnitude. This makes targeted gene correction or genome editing a viable option in human cells. Since ZFN-encoding plasmids could be used to transiently express ZFNs to target a DSB to a specific gene locus in human cells, they offer an excellent way for targeted delivery of the therapeutic genes to a pre-selected chromosomal site. The ZFN-encoding plasmid-based approach has the potential to circumvent all the problems associated with the viral delivery of therapeutic genes. The first therapeutic applications of ZFNs are likely to involve ex vivo therapy using a patient's own stem cells. After editing the stem cell genome, the cells could be expanded in culture and reinserted into the patient to produce differentiated cells with corrected functions. Initial targets likely include the causes of monogenic diseases, such as the IL2Rγ gene and the β-globin gene for gene correction and CCR5 gene for mutagenesis and disablement.

== Potential problems ==
=== Off-target cleavage ===
If the zinc finger domains are not specific enough for their target site or they do not target a unique site within the genome of interest, off-target cleavage may occur. Such off-target cleavage may lead to the production of enough double-strand breaks to overwhelm the repair machinery and, as a consequence, yield chromosomal rearrangements and/or cell death. Off-target cleavage events may also promote random integration of donor DNA. Two separate methods have been demonstrated to decrease off-target cleavage for 3-finger ZFNs that target two adjacent 9-basepair sites. Other groups use ZFNs with 4, 5 or 6 zinc fingers that target longer and presumably rarer sites and such ZFNs could theoretically yield less off-target activity. A comparison of a pair of 3-finger ZFNs and a pair of 4-finger ZFNs detected off-target cleavage in human cells at 31 loci for the 3-finger ZFNs and at 9 loci for the 4-finger ZFNs. Whole genome sequencing of C. elegans modified with a pair of 5-finger ZFNs found only the intended modification and a deletion at a site "unrelated to the ZFN site" indicating this pair of ZFNs was capable of targeting a unique site in the C. elegans genome.

=== Immunogenicity ===
As with many foreign proteins inserted into the human body, there is a risk of an immunological response against the therapeutic agent and the cells in which it is active. Since the protein must be expressed only transiently, however, the time over which a response may develop is short.

Liu et al. respectively target ZFNickases to the endogenous b-casein(CSN2) locus stimulates lysostaphin and human lysozyme gene addition by homology-directed repair and derive secrete lysostaphin cows.

== Prospects ==
The ability to precisely manipulate the genomes of plants and animals has numerous applications in basic research, agriculture, and human therapeutics. Using ZFNs to modify endogenous genes has traditionally been a difficult task due mainly to the challenge of generating zinc finger domains that target the desired sequence with sufficient specificity. Improved methods of engineering zinc finger domains and the availability of ZFNs from a commercial supplier now put this technology in the hands of increasing numbers of researchers. Several groups are also developing other types of engineered nucleases including engineered homing endonucleases and nucleases based on engineered TAL effectors. TAL effector nucleases (TALENs) are particularly interesting because TAL effectors appear to be very simple to engineer and TALENs can be used to target endogenous loci in human cells. But to date no one has reported the isolation of clonal cell lines or transgenic organisms using such reagents. One type of ZFN, known as SB-728-T, has been tested for potential application in the treatment of HIV.

== Zinc-finger nickases ==
Zinc-finger nickases (ZFNickases) are created by inactivating the catalytic activity of one ZFN monomer in the ZFN dimer required for double-strand cleavage. ZFNickases demonstrate strand-specific nicking activity in vitro and thus provide for highly specific single-strand breaks in DNA. These SSBs undergo the same cellular mechanisms for DNA that ZFNs exploit, but they show a significantly reduced frequency of mutagenic NHEJ repairs at their target nicking site. This reduction provides a bias for HR-mediated gene modifications. ZFNickases can induce targeted HR in cultured human and livestock cells, although at lower levels than corresponding ZFNs from which they were derived because nicks can be repaired without genetic alteration. A major limitation of ZFN-mediated gene modifications is the competition between NHEJ and HR repair pathways. Regardless of the presence of a DNA donor construct, both repair mechanisms can be activated following DSBs induced by ZFNs. Thus, ZFNickases is the first plausible attempt at engineering a method to favor the HR method of DNA repair as opposed to the error-prone NHEJ repair. By reducing NHEJ repairs, ZFNickases can thereby reduce the spectrum of unwanted off-target alterations. The ease by which ZFNickases can be derive from ZFNs provides a great platform for further studies regarding the optimization of ZFNickases and possibly increasing their levels of targeted HR while still maintain their reduced NHEJ frequency.

== See also ==
- Chimeric nuclease
- Genome editing
- Gene targeting
- Zinc finger protein
- Zinc finger chimera
- Protein engineering
- Zinc finger nuclease treatment of HIV
- CompoZr
