= CompoZr =

Protein manipulation product

The CompoZr Zinc finger nuclease (ZFN) platform is a technology developed by Sigma-Aldrich that allows researchers to target and manipulate the genome of living cells thereby creating cell lines or entire organisms with permanent and heritable gene deletions, insertions, or modifications.

The technology was released in September 2008. In December 2008, CompoZr ZFN Technology ranked third in The Scientist Magazine's Top Ten Innovations of 2008.

In July 2009, the first genetically modified mammal was created through the use of CompoZr ZFN Technology.
