= Srinivasan Chandrasegaran =

DNA researcher and scientist

Srinivasan Chandrasegaran is a professor in the department of Environmental Health and Engineering at Johns Hopkins Bloomberg School of Public Health. He is credited for the creation of zinc finger nucleases (ZFN) technology, which is capable of cleaving the structure of DNA.
