= Expression cassette =

DNA segment

An expression cassette is a distinct component of vector DNA consisting of a gene and regulatory sequence to be expressed by a transfected cell. In each successful transformation, the expression cassette directs the cell's machinery to make RNA and protein(s). Some expression cassettes are designed for modular cloning of protein-encoding sequences so that the same cassette can easily be altered to make different proteins.

An expression cassette is composed of one or more genes and the sequences controlling their expression. An expression cassette comprises three components: a promoter sequence, an open reading frame, and a 3' untranslated region that, in eukaryotes, usually contains a polyadenylation site.

Different expression cassettes can be transfected into different organisms including bacteria, yeast, plants, and mammalian cells as long as the correct regulatory sequences are used.

== See also ==
- Expression vector
- Gene cassette
