= Gene trapping =

Gene trapping is a high-throughput approach that is used to introduce insertional mutations across an organism's genome.

== Method ==
Trapping is performed with gene trap vectors whose principal element is a gene trapping cassette consisting of a promoterless reporter gene and/or selectable genetic marker, flanked by an upstream 3' splice site (splice acceptor; SA) and a downstream transcriptional termination sequence (polyadenylation sequence; polyA).

When inserted into an intron of an expressed gene, the gene trap cassette is transcribed from the endogenous promoter of that gene in the form of a fusion transcript in which the exon(s) upstream of the insertion site is spliced in frame to the reporter/selectable marker gene. Since transcription is terminated prematurely at the inserted polyadenylation site, the processed fusion transcript encodes a truncated and nonfunctional version of the cellular protein and the reporter/selectable marker. Thus, gene traps simultaneously inactivate and report the expression of the trapped gene at the insertion site, and provide a DNA tag (gene trap sequence tag, GTST) for the rapid identification of the disrupted gene.

== Access ==
The International Gene Trap Consortium is centralizing the data and supplies modified cell lines.
