= FokI =

Restriction enzyme

Restriction endonuclease Fok1, C terminal
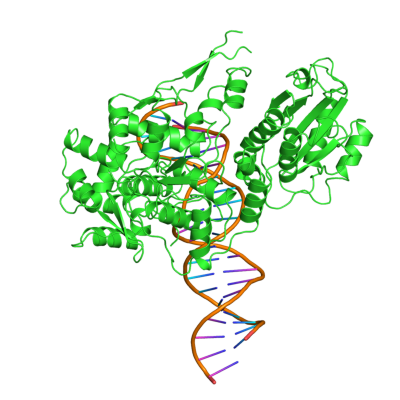
- Restriction endonuclease Fok1 bound to DNA PDB 1fok

Identifiers
- Symbol: Endonuc-Fok1_C
- Pfam: PF09254
- Pfam clan: CL0415
- InterPro: IPR015334
- SCOP2: 2fok / SCOPe / SUPFAM
Available protein structures:
- PDB: IPR015334 PF09254 (ECOD; PDBsum)
- AlphaFold: IPR015334; PF09254

The restriction endonuclease Fok1, naturally found in Flavobacterium okeanokoites, is a bacterial type IIS restriction endonuclease consisting of an N-terminal DNA-binding domain and a non sequence-specific DNA cleavage domain at the C-terminal. Once the protein is bound to duplex DNA via its DNA-binding domain at the 5'-GGATG-3' recognition site, the DNA cleavage domain is activated and cleaves the DNA at two locations, regardless of the nucleotide sequence at the cut site. The DNA is cut 9 nucleotides downstream of the motif on the forward strand, and 13 nucleotides downstream of the motif on the reverse strand, producing two sticky ends with 4-bp overhangs.

Its molecular mass is 65.4 kDa, being composed of 587 amino acids.

== DNA-binding domain ==
The recognition domain contains three subdomains (D1, D2, and D3) that are evolutionarily related to the DNA-binding domain of the catabolite gene activator protein, which contains a helix-turn-helix.

== DNA-cleavage domain ==
DNA cleavage is mediated through the non-specific cleavage domain which also includes the dimerisation surface. The dimer interface is formed by the parallel helices α4 and α5 and two loops P1 and P2 of the cleavage domain.

== Activity ==
When the nuclease is unbound to DNA, the endonuclease domain is sequestered by the DNA-binding domain and is released through a conformational change in the DNA-binding domain upon binding to its recognition site. Cleavage only occurs upon dimerization, when the recognition domain is bound to its cognate site and in the presence of magnesium ions.

== Exploitation ==
The endonuclease domain of Fok1 has been used in several studies, after combination with a variety of DNA-binding domains such as the zinc finger (see zinc finger nuclease), or inactive Cas9

One of several human vitamin D receptor gene variants is caused by a single nucleotide polymorphism in the start codon of the gene which can be distinguished through the use of the Fok1 enzyme.

== See also ==
- Protein engineering
- Genetic engineering
- Zinc finger nuclease
