= Homology directed repair =

Mechanism of DNA repair in cells

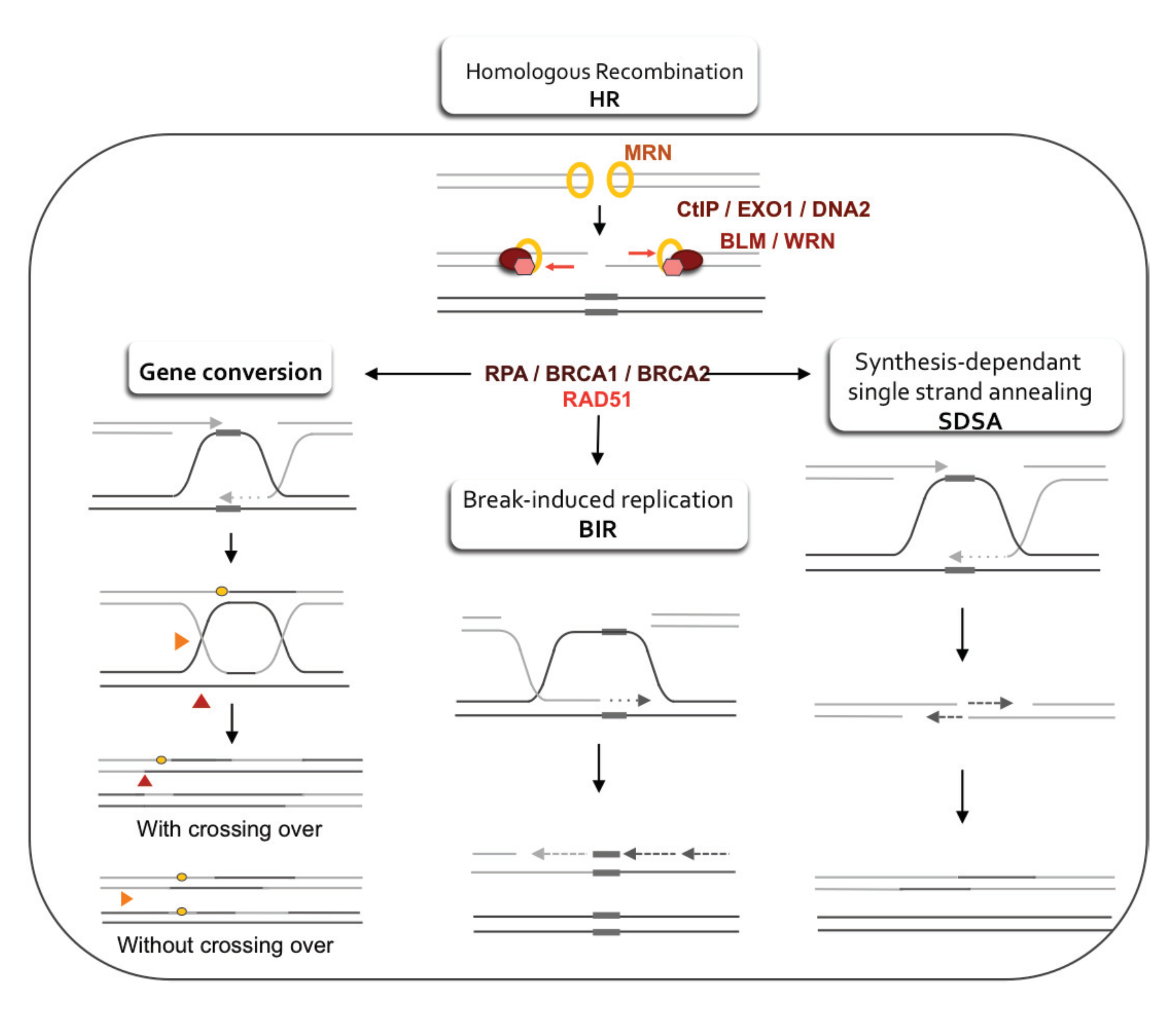
Double-strand break repair models that act via homologous recombination

Homology-directed repair (HDR) is a mechanism in cells to repair double-strand DNA lesions. The most common form of HDR is homologous recombination. The HDR mechanism can only be used by the cell when there is a homologous piece of DNA present in the nucleus, mostly in G2 and S phase of the cell cycle. Other examples of homology-directed repair include single-strand annealing and breakage-induced replication. When the homologous DNA is absent, another process called non-homologous end joining (NHEJ) takes place instead.

== Cancer suppression ==
HDR is important for suppressing the formation of cancer. HDR maintains genomic stability by repairing broken DNA strands; it is assumed to be error free because of the use of a template. When a double strand DNA lesion is repaired by NHEJ there is no validating DNA template present so it may result in a novel DNA strand formation with loss of information. A different nucleotide sequence in the DNA strand results in a different protein expressed in the cell. This protein error may cause processes in the cell to fail. For example, a receptor of the cell that can receive a signal to stop dividing may malfunction, so the cell ignores the signal and keeps dividing and can form a cancer. The importance of HDR can be seen from the fact that the mechanism is conserved throughout evolution. The HDR mechanism has also been found in more simple organisms, such as yeast.

== Biological pathway ==
The pathway of HDR has not been totally elucidated yet (March 2008). However, a number of experimental results point to the validity of certain models. It is generally accepted that histone H2AX (noted as γH2AX) is phosphorylated within seconds after damage occurs. H2AX is phosphorylated throughout the area surrounding the damage, not only precisely at the break. Therefore, it has been suggested that γH2AX functions as an adhesive component for attracting proteins to the damaged location. Several research groups have suggested that the phosphorylation of H2AX is done by ATM and ATR in cooperation with MDC1. It has been suggested that before or while H2AX is involved with the repair pathway, the MRN complex (which consists of Mre11, Rad50 and NBS1) is attracted to the broken DNA ends and other MRN complexes to keep the broken ends together. This action by the MRN complex may prevent chromosomal breaks. At some later point the DNA ends are processed so that unnecessary residuals of chemical groups are removed and single strand overhangs are formed. Meanwhile, from the beginning, every piece of single stranded DNA is covered by the protein RPA (Replication Protein A). The function of RPA is likely to keep the single stranded DNA pieces stable until the complementary piece is resynthesized by a polymerase. After this, Rad51 replaces RPA and forms filaments on the DNA strand. Working together with BRCA2 (Breast Cancer Associated), Rad51 couples a complementary DNA piece which invades the broken DNA strand to form a template for the polymerase. The polymerase is held onto the DNA strand by PCNA (Proliferating Cell Nuclear Antigen). PCNA forms typical patterns in the nucleus of the cell through which the current cell cycle can be determined. The polymerase synthesizes the missing part of the broken strand. When the broken strand is rebuilt, both strands need to uncouple again. Multiple ways of "uncoupling" have been suggested, but evidence is not yet sufficient to choose between models (March 2008). After the strands are separated the process is done.

The co-localization of Rad51 with the damage indicates that HDR has been initiated instead of NHEJ. In contrast, the presence of a Ku complex (Ku70 and Ku80) indicates that NHEJ has been initiated instead of HDR.

HDR and NHEJ repair double strand breaks. Other mechanisms such as NER (Nucleotide Excision Repair), BER (Base Excision Repair) and MMR recognise lesions and replace them via single strand perturbation.

== Mitosis ==
In the budding yeast Saccharomyces cerevisiae homology directed repair is primarily a response to spontaneous or induced damage that occurs during vegetative growth. (Also reviewed in Bernstein and Bernstein, pp 220–221). In order for yeast cells to undergo homology directed repair there must be present in the same nucleus a second DNA molecule containing sequence homology with the region to be repaired. In a diploid cell in G1 phase of the cell cycle, such a molecule is present in the form of the homologous chromosome. However, in the G2 stage of the cell cycle (following DNA replication), a second homologous DNA molecule is also present: the sister chromatid. Evidence indicates that, due to the special nearby relationship they share, sister chromatids are not only preferred over distant homologous chromatids as substrates for recombinational repair, but have the capacity to repair more DNA damage than do homologs.

== Meiosis ==
During meiosis up to one-third of all homology directed repair events occur between sister chromatids. The remaining two-thirds, or more, of homology directed repair occurs as a result of interaction between non-sister homologous chromatids.

== Oocytes ==
The fertility of females and the health of potential offspring critically depend on an adequate availability of high quality oocytes. Oocytes are largely maintained in the ovaries in a state of meiotic prophase arrest. In mammalian females the period of arrest may last for years. During this period of arrest, oocytes are subject to spontaneous DNA damage including double-strand breaks. However, the oocytes can efficiently repair DNA double-strand breaks, allowing the restoration of genetic integrity and the protection of offspring health. The process by which oocyte DNA damage can be corrected is referred to as homology directed homologous recombination repair.

== See also ==
- Homologous recombination
