= LSM5 =

Protein-coding gene in the species Homo sapiens

Identifiers
- Aliases: LSM5, YER146W, LSM5 homolog, U6 small nuclear RNA and mRNA degradation associated
- External IDs: OMIM: 607285; MGI: 1913623; GeneCards: LSM5
Available structures
| PDB | Ortholog search: PDBe RCSB |
| PDB | List of PDB id codes 3JCR |

Gene location (Human)
| Chr. | Chromosome 7 (human) |
| Band | 7p14.3 | Start | 32,485,338 bp |
| Band | 7p14.3 | End | 32,495,283 bp |

Gene location (Mouse)
| Chr. | Chromosome 6 (mouse) |
| Band | 6|6 B3 | Start | 56,678,048 bp |
| Band | 6|6 B3 | End | 56,681,695 bp |
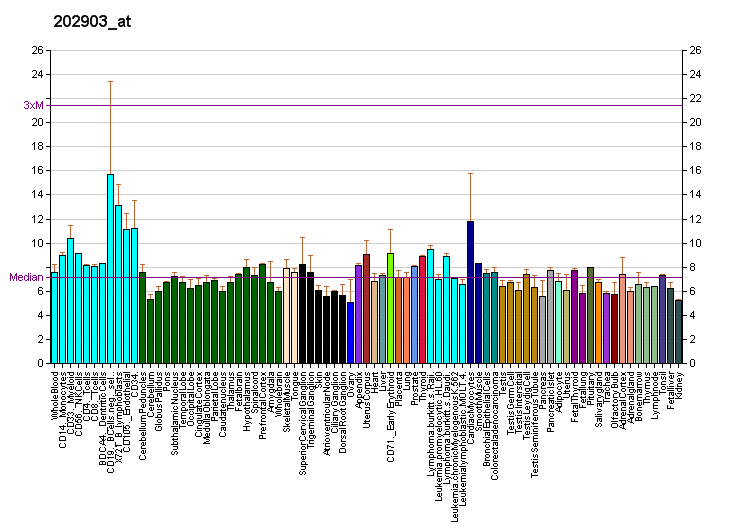

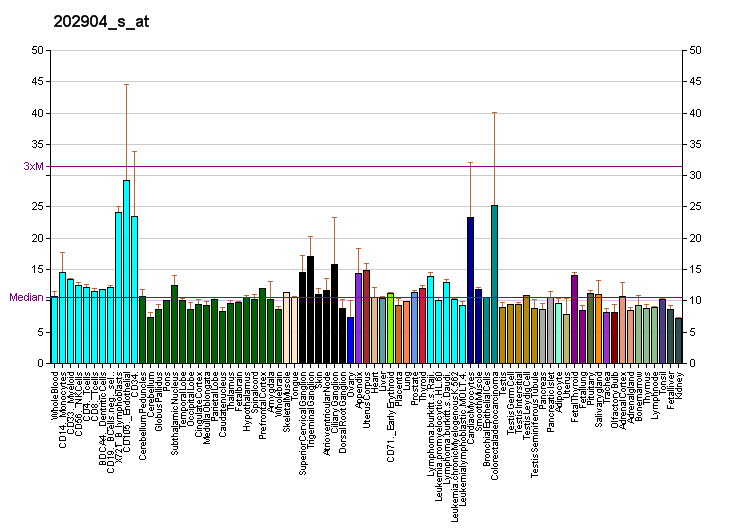

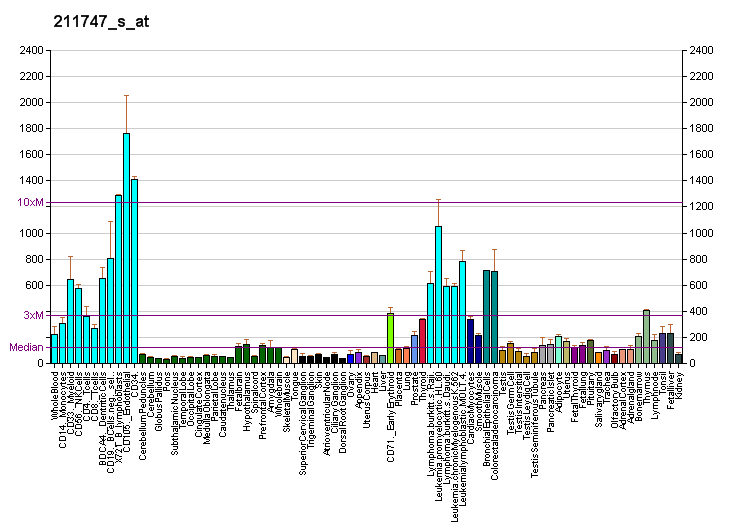
RNA expression pattern
| Bgee | Human / Mouse (ortholog); Top expressed in: ventricular zone; ganglionic eminence; human penis; rectum; superior surface of tongue; mucosa of transverse colon; body of pancreas; jejunum; pylorus; bone marrow / Top expressed in: embryo; embryo; epiblast; ventricular zone; morula; primary oocyte; yolk sac; thymus; neural tube; blastocyst; More reference expression data |
| BioGPS | More reference expression data |
Gene ontology
| Molecular function | protein binding; RNA binding |
| Cellular component | U6 snRNP; cytosol; Lsm1-7-Pat1 complex; U4/U6 x U5 tri-snRNP complex; spliceosomal complex; nucleus; nucleoplasm; U2-type precatalytic spliceosome; Lsm2-8 complex |
| Biological process | nuclear-transcribed mRNA catabolic process; mRNA splicing, via spliceosome; mRNA processing; exonucleolytic catabolism of deadenylated mRNA; RNA splicing; response to bacterium |
Sources:Amigo / QuickGO
Orthologs
| Databases | NCBI: entry; OMA: entry |
| Species | Human | Mouse |
| Entrez | 23658 | 66373 |
| Ensembl | ENSG00000106355 | ENSMUSG00000091625 |
| UniProt | Q9Y4Y9 | P62322 |
| RefSeq (mRNA) | NM_001130710; NM_001139499; NM_012322 | NM_025520 |
| RefSeq (protein) | NP_001124182; NP_001132971; NP_036454 | NP_079796 |
| Location (UCSC) | Chr 7: 32.49 – 32.5 Mb | Chr 6: 56.68 – 56.68 Mb |
| PubMed search |
- Wikidata
| View/Edit Human | View/Edit Mouse |

U6 snRNA-associated Sm-like protein LSm5 is a protein that in humans is encoded by the LSM5 gene.

Sm-like proteins were identified in a variety of organisms based on sequence homology with the Sm protein family (see SNRPD2; MIM 601061). Sm-like proteins contain the Sm sequence motif, which consists of 2 regions separated by a linker of variable length that folds as a loop. The Sm-like proteins are thought to form a stable heteromer present in tri-snRNP particles, which are important for pre-mRNA splicing.[supplied by OMIM]
