= CNMa =

CNMamide

Identifiers
- Organism: Drosophila melanogaster
- Symbol: CNMa
- Orthologs: OMA: entry
- UniProt: Q9W076
Search for
- Structures: Swiss-model
- Domains: InterPro

CNMamide receptor

Identifiers
- Organism: Drosophila melanogaster
- Symbol: CNMaR
- Orthologs: OMA: entry
- UniProt: Q9VT27
Search for
- Structures: Swiss-model
- Domains: InterPro

CNMamide (CNMa) is a cyclic neuropeptide identified by computational analysis of Drosophila melanogaster protein sequences and named after its C-terminal ending motif. A gene encoding CNMa was found in most arthropods and comparison among the precursor sequences of several representative species revealed high conservation, particularly in the region of the predicted mature peptide. Two conserved cysteine residues enveloping four amino acids form a disulfide bond and were shown to be important for binding of the peptide to its receptor. Expression of CNMa was confirmed in the larval and adult brain of D. melanogaster but the function of the peptide has not been elucidated yet.

== Sequences ==
CNMa is cleaved from a larger protein to form a mature peptide at two flanking dibasic (K or R) cleavage sites. The sequences of the final peptides are:

DROME:             Gln-Tyr-Met-Ser-Pro-Cys-His-Phe-Lys-Ile-Cys-Asn-Met-amide
APIME: Thr-Met-Ile-Ser-Tyr-Met-Thr-Leu-Cys-His-Phe-Lys-Ile-Cys-Asn-Met-amide
DAPPU:         Asp-Ser-Tyr-Leu-Ser-Met-Cys-His-Phe-Lys-Leu-Cys-Asn-Leu-amide

The overall sequence motif, in ProSite format, is [LPM]-C-[HI]-F-K-[IL]-C-N-[ML]-G-[RK](2). Some species encode two forms of CNMa via alternative splicing.

== Receptor ==
The receptor for CNMa (CG33696) is a G protein-coupled receptor. Phylogenetic analysis identified two separate clades of CNMaRs in arthropod species, but many taxa retain only one. Existence of two paralogous CNMaRs suggests that CNMaR has additional ligands in some insect species. This assumption is also supported by absence of the gene for CNMa in the genome of Lepidopteran species (such as Bombyx mori and Danaus plexippus) that retain the CNMaR.
