= Multiple EM for Motif Elicitation =

Multiple Expectation maximizations for Motif Elicitation (MEME) is a tool for discovering motifs in a group of related DNA or protein sequences.

A motif is a sequence pattern that occurs repeatedly in a group of related protein or DNA sequences and is often associated with some biological function. MEME represents motifs as position-dependent letter-probability matrices which describe the probability of each possible letter at each position in the pattern. Individual MEME motifs do not contain gaps. Patterns with variable-length gaps are split by MEME into two or more separate motifs.

MEME takes as input a group of DNA or protein sequences (the training set) and outputs as many motifs as requested. It uses statistical modeling techniques to automatically choose the best width, number of occurrences, and description for each motif.

MEME is the first of a collection of tools for analyzing motifs called the MEME suite.

== Definition ==
The MEME algorithm could be understood from two different perspectives. From a biological point of view, MEME identifies and characterizes shared motifs in a set of unaligned sequences. From the computer science aspect, MEME finds a set of non-overlapping, approximately matching substrings given a starting set of strings.

== Use ==
MEME can be used to find similar biological functions and structures in different sequences. It is necessary to take into account that the sequences variation can be significant and that the motifs are sometimes very small. It is also useful to take into account that the binding sites for proteins are very specific. This makes it easier to reduce wet-lab experiments (saving cost and time). Indeed, to better discover the motifs relevant from a biological point it is necessary to carefully choose: the best width of motifs, the number of occurrences in each sequence, and the composition of each motif.

== Algorithm components ==
The algorithm uses several types of well known functions:

- Expectation maximization (EM).
- EM based heuristic for choosing the EM starting point.
- Maximum likelihood ratio based (LRT-based) heuristic for determining the best number of model-free parameters.
- Multi-start for searching over possible motif widths.
- Greedy search for finding multiple motifs.

However, one often doesn't know where the starting position is. Several possibilities exist: exactly one motif per sequence, or one or zero motif per sequence, or any number of motifs per sequence.

== See also ==
- Sequence motif
- Sequence alignment
