= GCM1 =

Protein-coding gene in the species Homo sapiens

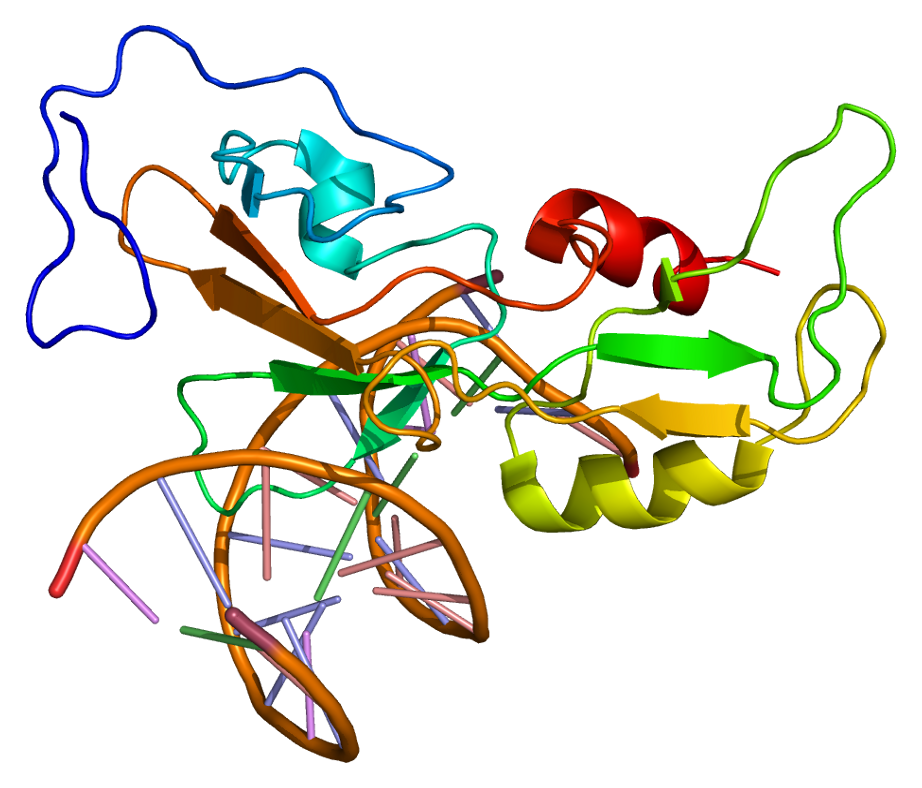

Identifiers
- Aliases: GCM1, GCMA, hGCMa, glial cells missing homolog 1, glial cells missing transcription factor 1
- External IDs: OMIM: 603715; MGI: 108045; GeneCards: GCM1
Available structures
PDB	Ortholog search: PDBe RCSB
PDB	List of PDB id codes 1ODH

Gene location (Human)
Chr.	Chromosome 6 (human)
Band	6p12.1	Start	53,126,961 bp
Band	6p12.1	End	53,148,841 bp

Gene location (Mouse)
Chr.	Chromosome 9 (mouse)
Band	9 E1|9 43.49 cM	Start	77,959,206 bp
Band	9 E1|9 43.49 cM	End	77,972,906 bp
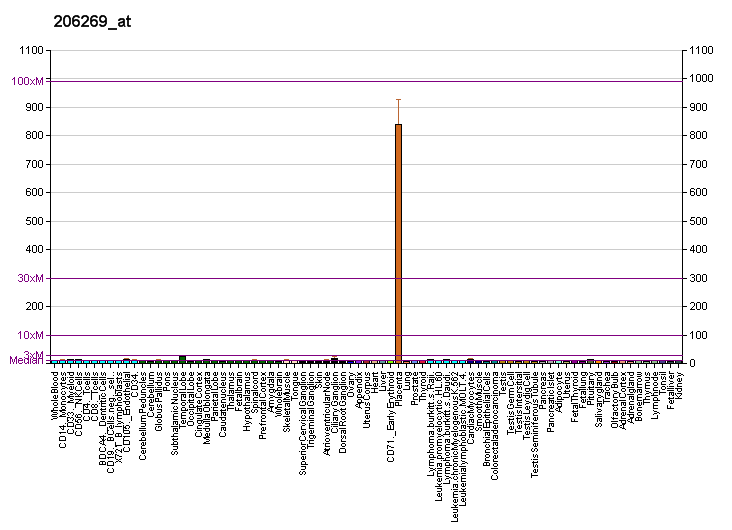
RNA expression pattern
Bgee	Human / Mouse (ortholog); Top expressed in: placenta; decidua; testicle; sperm; blood; kidney tubule; human kidney; islet of Langerhans; white blood cell; metanephros / Top expressed in: syncytiotrophoblast; embryo; proximal tubule; right kidney; yolk sac; trophoblast giant cell; lumbar spinal ganglion; human kidney; metanephros; More reference expression data
BioGPS	More reference expression data
Gene ontology
Molecular function	DNA binding; DNA-binding transcription factor activity; zinc ion binding; DNA-binding transcription activator activity, RNA polymerase II-specific; transcription factor binding; histone deacetylase binding; metal ion binding; RNA polymerase II cis-regulatory region sequence-specific DNA binding; protein binding; DNA-binding transcription factor activity, RNA polymerase II-specific
Cellular component	transcription regulator complex; nucleus
Biological process	regulation of transcription, DNA-templated; anatomical structure morphogenesis; positive regulation of syncytium formation by plasma membrane fusion; transcription by RNA polymerase II; transcription, DNA-templated; multicellular organism development; branching involved in labyrinthine layer morphogenesis; astrocyte fate commitment; positive regulation of transcription by RNA polymerase II; gliogenesis; regulation of cell differentiation involved in embryonic placenta development; cell differentiation involved in embryonic placenta development
Sources:Amigo / QuickGO
Orthologs
Databases	NCBI: entry; OMA: entry
Species	Human	Mouse
Entrez	8521	14531
Ensembl	ENSG00000137270	ENSMUSG00000023333
UniProt	Q9NP62	P70348
RefSeq (mRNA)	NM_003643	NM_008103
RefSeq (protein)	NP_003634	NP_032129
Location (UCSC)	Chr 6: 53.13 – 53.15 Mb	Chr 9: 77.96 – 77.97 Mb
PubMed search
- Wikidata
View/Edit Human	View/Edit Mouse

Chorion-specific transcription factor GCMa is a protein that, in humans, is encoded by the GCM1 gene.

This gene encodes a DNA-binding protein with a gcm-motif (glial cell missing motif). The encoded protein is a homolog of the Drosophila glial cells missing gene (gcm). This protein binds to the GCM-motif (A/G)CCCGCAT, a novel sequence among known targets of DNA-binding proteins. The N-terminal DNA-binding domain confers the unique DNA-binding activity of this protein.

In cancer patients, GCM1 expression has been linked to both higher and lower survival rates, depending on cancer type.
