= Sequence logo =

Bioinformatic graphic

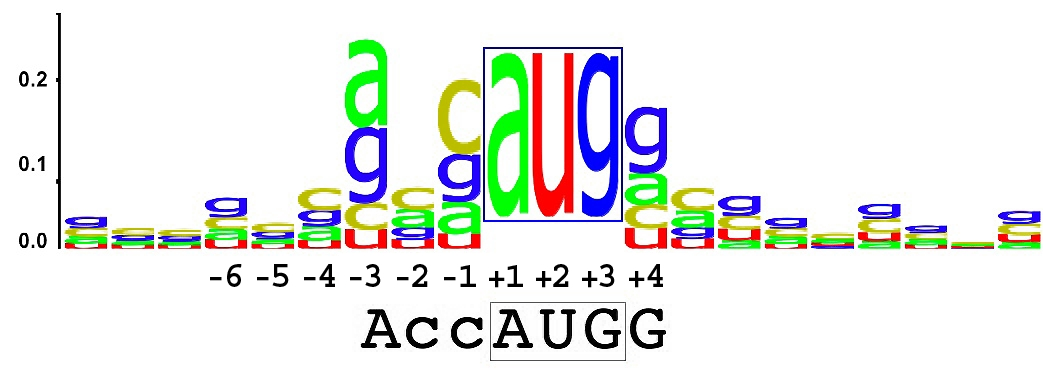
A sequence logo showing the most conserved bases around the initiation codon from all human mRNAs (Kozak consensus sequence). Note that the initiation codon is not drawn to scale, otherwise the letters AUG would each have a height of 2 bits.

In bioinformatics, a sequence logo is a graphical representation of the sequence conservation of nucleotides (in a strand of DNA/RNA) or amino acids (in protein sequences). A sequence logo is created from a collection of aligned sequences and depicts the consensus sequence and diversity of the sequences. Sequence logos are frequently used to depict sequence characteristics such as protein-binding sites in DNA or functional units in proteins.

== Overview ==
A sequence logo consists of a stack of letters at each position. The relative sizes of the letters indicate their frequency in the sequences. The total height of the letters depicts the information content of the position, in bits.

== Logo creation ==
To create sequence logos, related DNA, RNA or protein sequences, or DNA sequences that have common conserved binding sites, are aligned so that the most conserved parts create good alignments. A sequence logo can then be created from the conserved multiple sequence alignment. The sequence logo will show how well residues are conserved at each position: the higher the number of residues, the higher the letters will be, because the better the conservation is at that position. Different residues at the same position are scaled according to their frequency. The height of the entire stack of residues is the information measured in bits. Sequence logos can be used to represent conserved DNA binding sites, where transcription factors bind.

The information content (y-axis) of position $i$ is given by:

for amino acids, $R_i = \log_2(20) - (H_i + e_n)$
for nucleic acids, $R_i = \log_2(4) - (H_i + e_n)$

where $H_i$ is the uncertainty (sometimes called the Shannon entropy) of position $i$

$$H_i = - \sum_{b=1}^{t} f_{b,i} \times \log_2 f_{b,i}$$

Here, $f_{b,i}$ is the relative frequency of base or amino acid $b$ at position $i$, and $e_n$ is the small-sample correction for an alignment of $n$ letters. The height of letter $b$ in column $i$ is given by

$$\text{height} = f_{b,i} \times R_i$$

The approximation for the small-sample correction, $e_n$, is given by:

$$e_n = \frac{1}{\ln{2}}\times\frac{s-1}{2n}$$

where $s$ is 4 for nucleotides, 20 for amino acids, and $n$ is the number of sequences in the alignment.

== Consensus logo ==
A consensus logo is a simplified variation of a sequence logo that can be embedded in text format. Like a sequence logo, a consensus logo is created from a collection of aligned protein or DNA/RNA sequences and conveys information about the conservation of each position of a sequence motif or sequence alignment . However, a consensus logo displays only conservation information, and not explicitly the frequency information of each nucleotide or amino acid at each position. Instead of a stack made of several characters, denoting the relative frequency of each character, the consensus logo depicts the degree of conservation of each position using the height of the consensus character at that position.

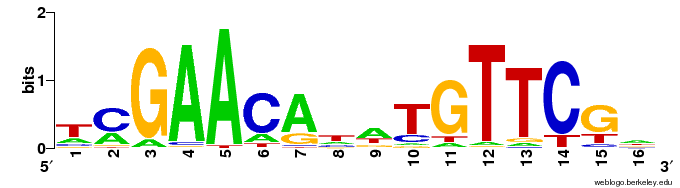
A sequence logo for the LexA-binding motif of several Gram-positive species.

A consensus logo for the LexA-binding motif of several Gram-positive species.

=== Advantages and drawbacks ===
The main, and obvious, advantage of consensus logos over sequence logos is their ability to be embedded as text in any Rich Text Format supporting editor/viewer and, therefore, in scientific manuscripts. As described above, the consensus logo is a cross between sequence logos and consensus sequences. As a result, compared to a sequence logo, the consensus logo omits information (the relative contribution of each character to the conservation of that position in the motif/alignment). Hence, a sequence logo should be used preferentially whenever possible. That being said, the need to include graphic figures in order to display sequence logos has perpetuated the use of consensus sequences in scientific manuscripts, even though they fail to convey information on both conservation and frequency. Consensus logos represent therefore an improvement over consensus sequences whenever motif/alignment information has to be constrained to text.

== Extensions ==
Hidden Markov models (HMMs) not only consider the information content of aligned positions in an alignment, but also of insertions and deletions. In an HMM sequence logo used by Pfam, three rows are added to indicate the frequencies of occupancy (presence) and insertion, as well as the expected insertion length.

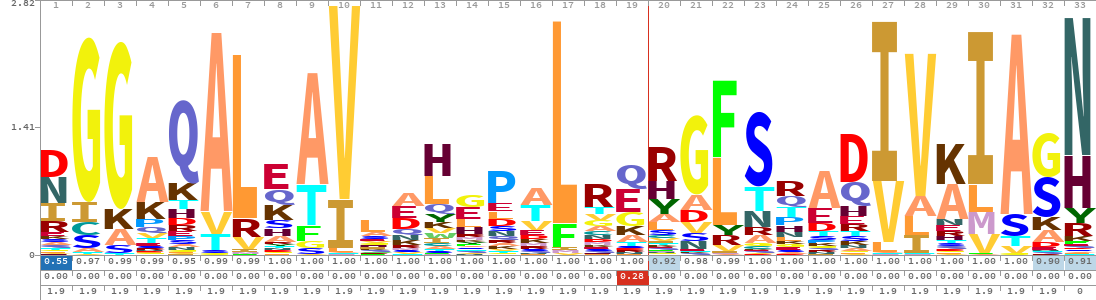
A sequence logo for TALE-likes. Note the reduced occupancy (blue) at the position one and the occasional insertion at position 19 (red).

== See also ==
- Sequence motif
- Position-specific scoring matrix
- DNA binding site
