= EcoRV =

Restriction enzyme

Restriction endonuclease EcoRV
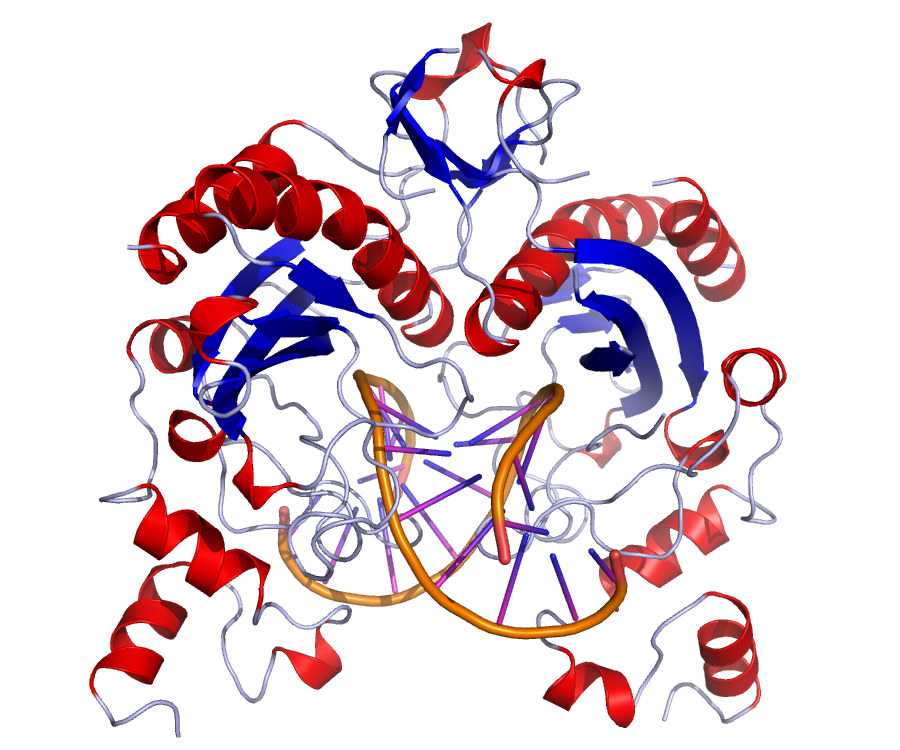
- EcoRV crystal structure complexed with double-stranded DNA

Identifiers
- Symbol: Endonuc-EcoRV
- Pfam: PF09233
- InterPro: IPR015314
- SCOP2: 1sx5 / SCOPe / SUPFAM
Available protein structures:
- PDB: IPR015314 PF09233 (ECOD; PDBsum)
- AlphaFold: IPR015314; PF09233

DNA recognition sequence of EcoRV. The green line represents the cut site.

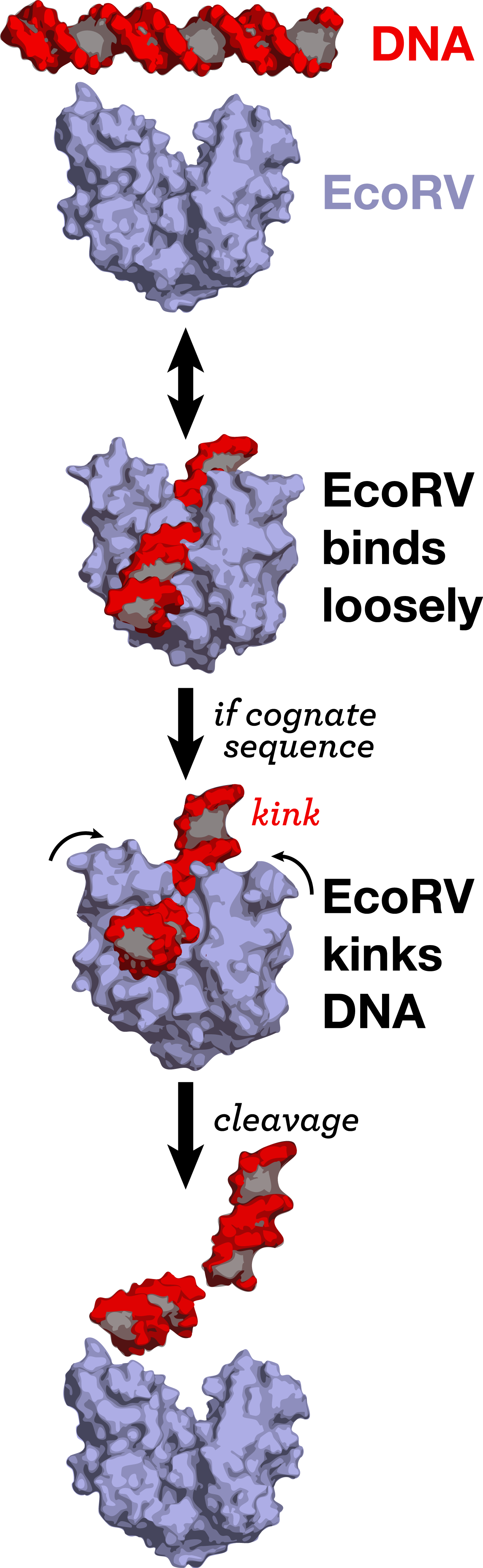
EcoRV cleaving DNA. The protein loosely binds DNA and scans for its recognition sequence. Once found, EcoRV kinks the DNA in a 50° angle and cleaves at the cognate sequence.

EcoRV (pronounced "eco R five") is a type II restriction endonuclease isolated from certain strains of Escherichia coli. It has the alternative name Eco32I.

In molecular biology, it is a commonly used restriction enzyme. It creates blunt ends. The enzyme recognizes the palindromic 6-base DNA sequence 5'-GAT|ATC-3' and makes a blunt end at the vertical line. The complementary sequence is then 3'-CTA|TAG-5'. The ends are blunt and can be ligated into a blunt cloning site easily but with lower efficiency than sticky ends.

== Structure ==
The structure of this enzyme, and several mutants, in complex with the DNA sequence which it cuts has been solved by X-ray crystallography.

The core of the enzyme consists of a five-stranded mixed β-sheet flanked by α-helices. The core is conserved in all other type II restriction endonucleases. It also has an N-terminal dimerization subdomain formed by a short α-helix, a two-stranded antiparallel -sheet, and a long α-helix. This subdomain is found only in EcoRV and PvuII.

== Mode of action ==
Like EcoRI, EcoRV forms a homodimer in solution before binding and acting on its recognition sequence. Initially the enzyme binds weakly to a non-specific site on the DNA. It randomly walks along the molecule until the specific recognition site is found. EcoRV has a high specificity for its target DNA sequence.

Binding of the enzyme induces a conformational change in the DNA, bending it by about 50°. DNA bending results in the unstacking of the bases, widening of the minor groove, and compression of the major groove. This brings the phosphodiester linkage to be broken closer to the active site of the enzyme, where it can be cleaved. Cleavage occurs within the recognition sequence, and does not require ATP hydrolysis.

EcoRV is the only type II restriction endonuclease known to cause a major protein-induced conformational change in the DNA.

== Uses ==
EcoRV is often used to cut open a plasmid vector to insert a gene-of-interest during gene cloning. The enzyme is supplied by many manufacturers and requires bovine serum albumin to work properly.

== See also ==
- EcoRI, another nuclease enzyme from E. coli.
- EcoRII, another nuclease enzyme from E. coli.
- FokI, a nuclease enzyme from Flavobacterium okeanokoites
