= Adam Bogdanove =

Professor of Plant Pathology

- Born: 1964 (age 61–62)
- Education: Yale University, Cornell University
- Known for: TAL effectors, Genome editing
- Scientific career
- Fields: Plant Pathology, Bioengineering
- Workplaces: Cornell University, Boyce Thompson Institute

Adam J. Bogdanove (born 1964) is a Professor of Plant Pathology at Cornell University. He is most notable for his central role in the development of TAL effector based DNA targeting reagents, following his discovery of TAL effector modularity with Matthew Moscou in 2009. Since, he has been a leader in the field, pioneering applications in genome editing and contributing one of the most widely used methods for designing custom TAL effectors using Golden Gate Cloning. Bogdanove is now widely recognized for revolutionizing the area of DNA targeting, along with scientists such as Jennifer Doudna and Emmanuelle Charpentier.

== Education ==
Bogdanove earned his Bachelor of Science degree in Biology from Yale University in 1987, and his Ph.D. in Plant Pathology from Cornell University in 1997, going on to do postdoctoral work at Purdue University.

== Research and career ==
Bogdanove began his academic career in 2000 at Iowa State University as one of the first faculty hires of the Plant Science Institute. It was there that he made the 2006 landmark discovery of how TAL effectors recognize target sequences. A significant portion of his work uncovered the mechanisms by which TAL effectors increase disease susceptibility by manipulating host gene expression. Further work has paved the way for genome editing technologies like CRISPR and their applications, which use modified proteins to induce targeted changes in plant and animal DNA sequences. In 2012, Bogdanove returned to his alma mater as a Professor in the Plant Pathology and Plant- Microbe Biology section at Cornell University. Bogdanove's present research focuses on the pathogen Xanthomonas oryzae and its interactions with species of rice.

== Selected bibliography ==
- Bogdanove, Adam J.; Martin, G. B. (2000-08-01). "AvrPto-dependent Pto-interacting proteins and AvrPto-interacting proteins in tomato". Proceedings of the National Academy of Sciences. 97 (16): 8836–8840. Bibcode:2000PNAS...97.8836B. doi:10.1073/pnas.97.16.8836. PMC 34020. PMID 10922043. S2CID 3093542.
- Martin, Gregory B.; Bogdanove, Adam J.; Sessa, Guido (2003). "Understanding the Functions of Plant Disease Resistance Proteins". Annual Review of Plant Biology. 54 (1): 23–61. doi:10.1146/annurev.arplant.54.031902.135035. PMID 14502984.
- Wise, Roger P.; Moscou, Matthew J.; Bogdanove, Adam J.; Whitham, Steven A. (2007-09-08). "Transcript Profiling in Host–Pathogen Interactions". Annual Review of Phytopathology. 45 (1): 329–369. doi:10.1146/annurev.phyto.45.011107.143944. PMID 17480183.
- Moscou, M. J.; Bogdanove, A. J. (2009-10-29). "A Simple Cipher Governs DNA Recognition by TAL Effectors". Science. 326 (5959): 1501. Bibcode:2009Sci...326.1501M. doi:10.1126/science.1178817. PMID 19933106. S2CID 6648530.
- Ryan, Robert P.; Vorhölter, Frank-Jörg; Potnis, Neha; Jones, Jeffrey B.; Van Sluys, Marie-Anne; Bogdanove, Adam J.; Dow, J. Maxwell (2011-04-11). "Pathogenomics of Xanthomonas: understanding bacterium–plant interactions". Nature Reviews Microbiology. 9 (5): 344–355. doi:10.1038/nrmicro2558. PMID 21478901. S2CID 37510468.
- Cermak, Tomas; Doyle, Erin L.; Christian, Michelle; Wang, Li; Zhang, Yong; Schmidt, Clarice; Baller, Joshua A.; Somia, Nikunj V.; Bogdanove, Adam J.; Voytas, Daniel F. (2011-04-14). "Efficient design and assembly of custom TALEN and other TAL effector-based constructs for DNA targeting". Nucleic Acids Research. 39 (12): e82. doi:10.1093/nar/gkr218. PMC 3130291. PMID 21493687. S2CID 2703718.
- Bogdanove, Adam J.; Voytas, D. F. (2011-09-29). "TAL Effectors: Customizable Proteins for DNA Targeting". Science. 333 (6051): 1843–1846. Bibcode:2011Sci...333.1843B. doi:10.1126/science.1204094. PMID 21960622. S2CID 5175261.
- Mak, A. N.-S.; Bradley, P.; Cernadas, R. A.; Bogdanove, A. J.; Stoddard, B. L. (2012-01-05). "The Crystal Structure of TAL Effector PthXo1 Bound to Its DNA Target". Science. 335 (6069): 716–719. Bibcode:2012Sci...335..716M. doi:10.1126/science.1216211. PMC 3427646. PMID 22223736. S2CID 46816158.
- Doyle, Erin L.; Booher, Nicholas J.; Standage, Daniel S.; Voytas, Daniel F.; Brendel, Volker P.; VanDyk, John K.; Bogdanove, Adam J. (2012-06-12). "TAL Effector-Nucleotide Targeter (TALE-NT) 2.0: tools for TAL effector design and target prediction". Nucleic Acids Research. 40 (W1): W117–W122. doi:10.1093/nar/gks608. PMC 3394250. PMID 22693217. S2CID 445132.
