= R.EcoRII =

Restriction enzyme

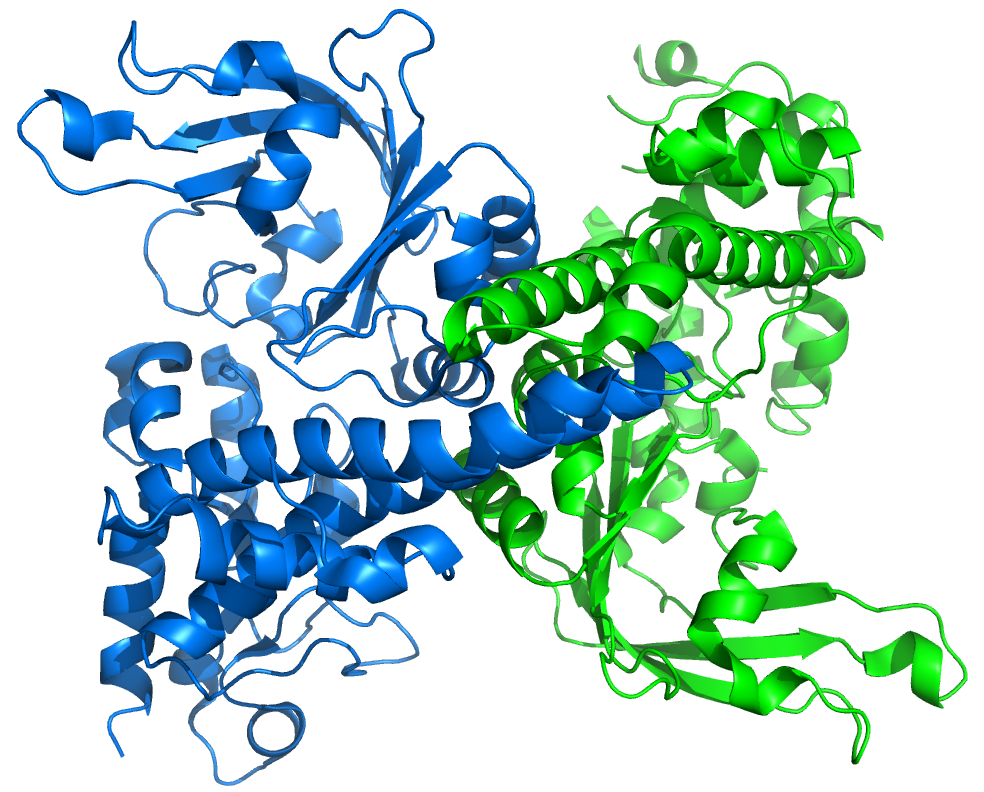
Eco RII dimer based on PDB ID 1NA6

EcoRII (pronounced 'eco R two') is an Restriction endonuclease enzyme (REase) of the restriction modification system (RM) naturally found in Escherichia coli, a Gram-negative bacteria. Its molecular mass is 45.2 kDa, being composed of 402 amino acids.

== Mode of action ==
EcoRII is a bacterial Type IIE REase that interacts with two or three copies of the pseudopalindromic DNA recognition sequence 5'-CCWGG-3' (W = A or T), one being the actual target of cleavage, the other(s) serving as the allosteric activator(s). EcoRII cuts the target DNA sequence CCWGG, generating sticky ends.

== Cut diagram ==
Recognition site

5' NNCCWGGNN
3' NNGGWCCNN 

Cut results

5' NN  CCWGGNN
3' NNGGWCC  NN

== Structure ==
Restriction endonuclease EcoRII, N-terminal
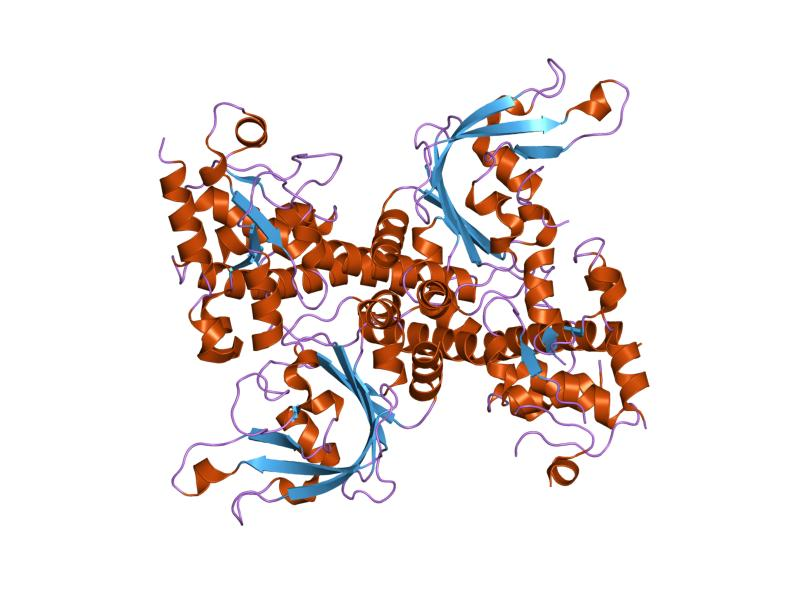
- crystal structure of restriction endonuclease ecorii mutant r88a

Identifiers
- Symbol: EcoRII-N
- Pfam: PF09217
- Pfam clan: CL0405
- InterPro: IPR015300
- SCOP2: 1na6 / SCOPe / SUPFAM
Available protein structures:
- PDB: IPR015300 PF09217 (ECOD; PDBsum)
- AlphaFold: IPR015300; PF09217

EcoRII C terminal
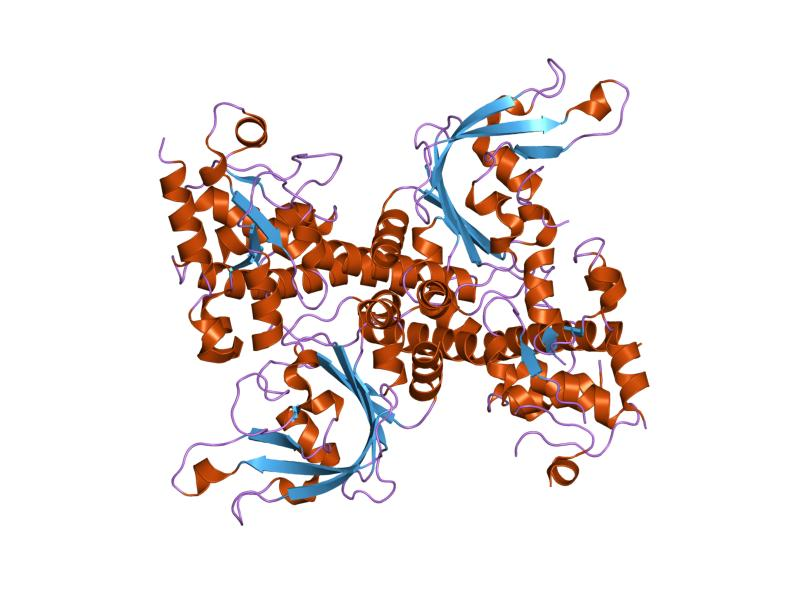
- crystal structure of restriction endonuclease ecorii mutant r88a

Identifiers
- Symbol: EcoRII-C
- Pfam: PF09019
- Pfam clan: CL0236
- InterPro: IPR015109
Available protein structures:
- PDB: IPR015109 PF09019 (ECOD; PDBsum)
- AlphaFold: IPR015109; PF09019

The apo crystal structure of EcoRII mutant R88A (PDB: 1NA6) has been solved at 2.1 Å resolution. The EcoRII monomer has two domains, N-terminal and C-terminal, linked through a hinge loop.

=== Effector-binding domain ===
The N-terminal effector-binding domain has an archetypal DNA-binding pseudobarrel fold (SCOP 101936) with a prominent cleft. Structural superposition showed it is evolutionarily related to:

- B3 DNA binding domain (SCOP 117343) from the transcription factors in higher plants (PDB: 1WID)
- C-terminal domain of restriction endonuclease BfiI (PDB: 2C1L)

=== Catalytic domain ===
The C-terminal catalytic domain has a typical restriction endonuclease-like fold (SCOP 52979) and belongs to the large (more than 30 members) restriction endonuclease superfamily (SCOP 52980).

== Autoinhibition/activation mechanism ==
Structure-based sequence alignment and site-directed mutagenesis identified the putative PD..D/EXK active sites of the EcoRII catalytic domain dimer that in apo structure are spatially blocked by the N-terminal domains.

== See also ==
- EcoRI, another nuclease enzyme from Escherichia coli.
- EcoRV, another nuclease enzyme from Escherichia coli.
- B3 DNA binding domain from higher plants is evolutionary related to EcoRII
- FokI, another nuclease enzyme from Flavobacterium okeanokoites
