= GCM transcription factors =

Protein family

GCM
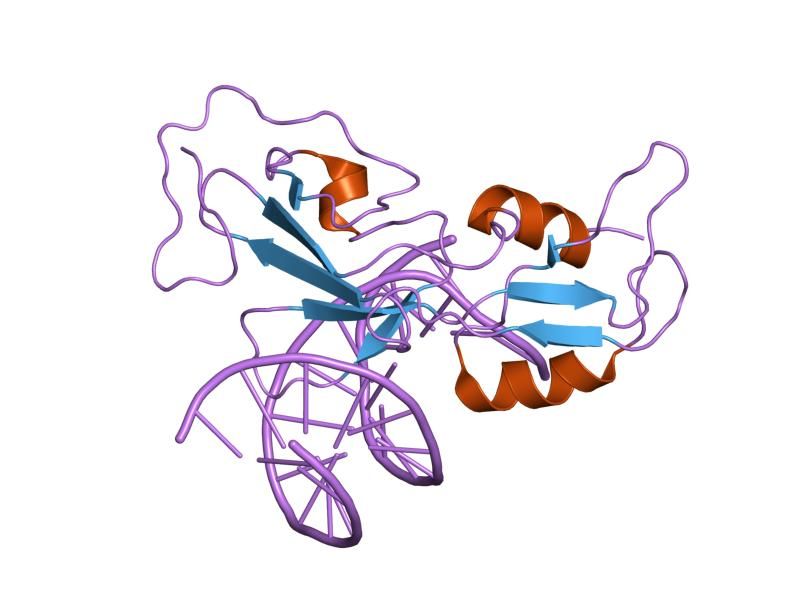
- structure of the gcm domain bound to dna

Identifiers
- Symbol: GCM
- Pfam: PF03615
- Pfam clan: CL0274
- InterPro: IPR003902
- PROSITE: PS50807
- SCOP2: 1odh / SCOPe / SUPFAM
Available protein structures:
- PDB: IPR003902 PF03615 (ECOD; PDBsum)
- AlphaFold: IPR003902; PF03615

In molecular biology, the GCM transcription factors are a family of proteins which contain a GCM motif. The GCM motif is a domain that has been identified in proteins belonging to a family of transcriptional regulators involved in fundamental developmental processes which comprise Drosophila melanogaster GCM and its mammalian homologues (human GCM1 and GCM2). In GCM transcription factors the N-terminal moiety contains a DNA-binding domain of 150 amino acids. Sequence conservation is highest in this GCM domain. In contrast, the C-terminal moiety contains one or two transactivating regions and is only poorly conserved.

The GCM motif has been shown to be a DNA binding domain that recognises preferentially the nonpalindromic octamer 5'-ATGCGGGT-3'. The GCM motif contains many conserved basic amino acid residues, seven cysteine residues, and four histidine residues. The conserved cysteines are involved in shaping the overall conformation of the domain, in the process of DNA binding and in the redox regulation of DNA binding. The GCM domain as a new class of Zn-containing DNA-binding domain with no similarity to any other DNA-binding domain. The GCM domain consists of a large and a small domain tethered together by one of the two Zn ions present in the structure. The large and the small domains comprise five- and three-stranded beta-sheets, respectively, with three small helical segments packed against the same side of the two beta-sheets. The GCM domain exercises a novel mode of sequence-specific DNA recognition, where the five-stranded beta-pleated sheet inserts into the major groove of the DNA. Residues protruding from the edge strand of the beta-pleated sheet and the following loop and strand contact the bases and backbone of both DNA strands, providing specificity for its DNA target site.
