= MochiView =

MochiView (Motif and ChIP Viewer) is software that integrates a genome browser and tools for data and Sequence motif visualization and analysis. The software uses the Java language, contains a fully integrated JavaDB database, is platform-independent, and is freely available.

== Description ==
MochiView was originally designed as a platform for rapidly browsing, visualizing, and extracting Sequence motifs from ChIP-chip and ChIP-Seq data. The software uses a generalized data format that serves other purposes as well, such as the visualization and analysis of RNA-Seq data or the import, maintenance, exploration, and analysis of Sequence motif libraries. The MochiView website contains a detailed feature list and demo videos of the software showing smooth panning/zooming, data/gene/sequence/coordinate browsers, and plot interactivity. The software was created by Oliver Homann in the laboratory of Alexander Johnson at the University of California at San Francisco.
