= William Stafford Noble =

American computational biologist

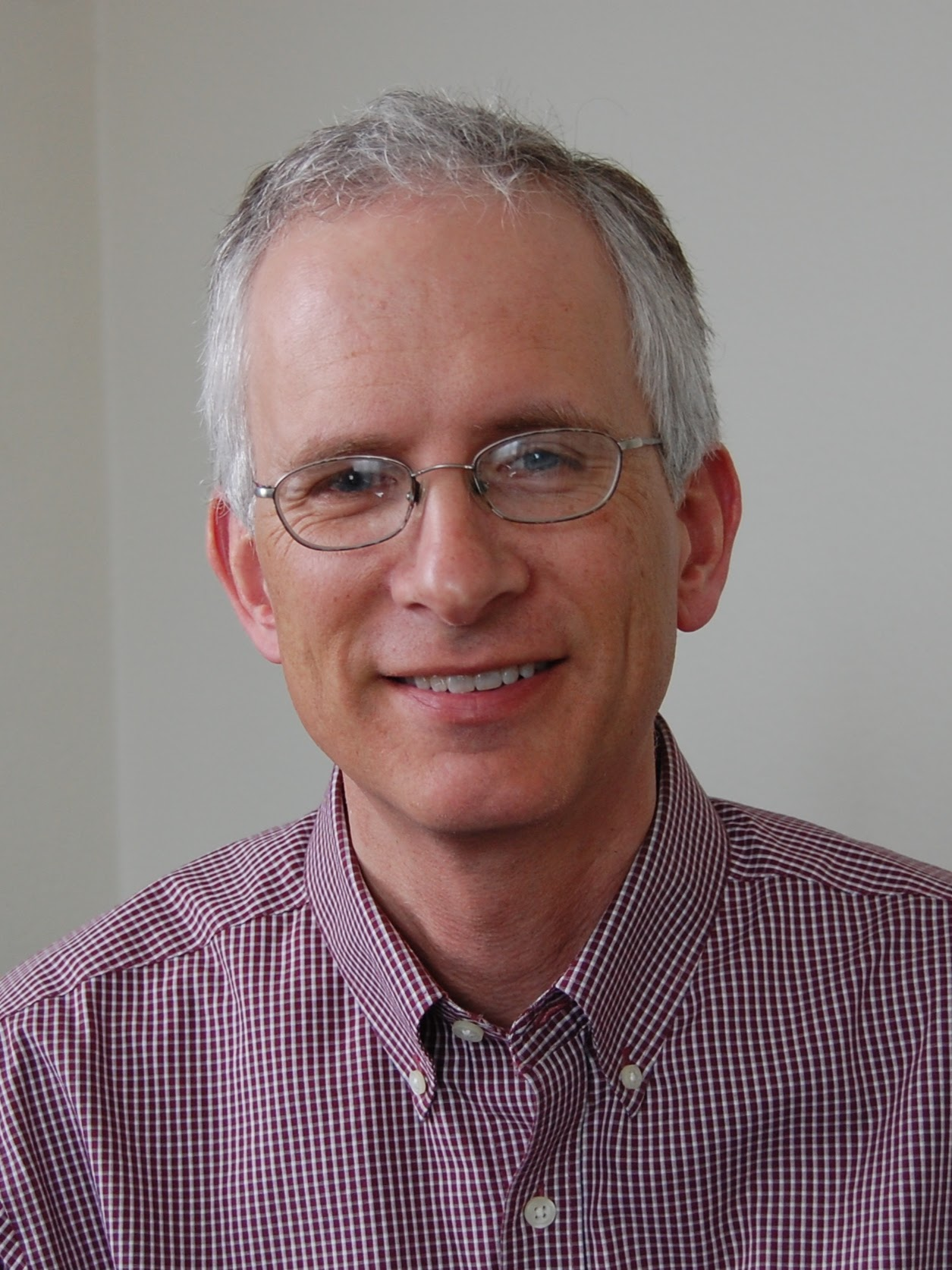
- Noble in 2017
- Education: Stanford University (B.S.); University of California, San Diego (Ph.D. 1998); University of California, Santa Cruz (Postdoc)
- Known for: Applying machine learning to biological data analysis Analysis of proteomics data (Percolator); Sequence analysis (MEME suite); Kernel methods in biology
- Awards: NSF CAREER Award; Sloan Research Fellowship; ISCB Innovator Award (2019); ISCB Fellow; Highly Cited Researcher (Clarivate Analytics)
- Scientific career
- Fields: Bioinformatics, Computational biology, Machine learning, Genomics, Proteomics
- Workplaces: University of Washington; Columbia University
- Website: noble.gs.washington.edu/~wnoble/

William Stafford Noble (formerly William Noble Grundy) is an American computational biologist. He is a professor in the Department of Genome Sciences and the Paul G. Allen School of Computer Science & Engineering at the University of Washington. Noble is known for developing machine learning and statistical methods for analyzing biological data, particularly in genomics and proteomics. His research includes work on sequence analysis, kernel methods, genome annotation, the 3D structure of the genome, and the analysis of shotgun proteomics data. He is a recipient of the ISCB Innovator Award and is an ISCB Fellow.

== Education and early career ==
Noble received his undergraduate degree from Stanford University. He spent several years between his undergraduate and graduate studies working for companies and serving for two years in the Peace Corps, teaching mathematics and English in Africa.

He earned his Ph.D. in computer science and cognitive science from the University of California, San Diego (UCSD) in 1998. He then completed a one-year postdoctoral fellowship with David Haussler at the University of California, Santa Cruz.

Following his postdoc, Noble became an assistant professor in the Department of Computer Science at Columbia University.

== Career and research ==
In 2002, Noble joined the faculty of the Department of Genome Sciences at the University of Washington (UW). He holds a joint appointment in the Paul G. Allen School of Computer Science & Engineering. At UW, he serves as the director of the Computational Molecular Biology Program and is a co-director of the UW 4-Dimensional Genomic Nuclear Organization of Mammalian Embryogenesis (4D GENOME) Center. He is also a Senior Data Science Fellow at the UW eScience Institute.

Noble's research focuses on applying and developing computational methods, particularly from machine learning and statistics, to interpret complex biological datasets. Key areas include:

- Proteomics: Developing methods for analyzing mass spectrometry data from shotgun proteomics experiments, including the widely used Percolator algorithm for improving peptide identifications using semi-supervised learning.
- Genomics and Sequence analysis: Creating computational tools for analyzing DNA and protein sequences. He is a contributor to the MEME suite for motif discovery.
- Kernel methods: Applying kernel methods for learning from heterogeneous biological data and for tasks like protein classification and homology detection.
- Chromatin Structure: Investigating the three-dimensional structure of the genome.
- Gene regulation: Developing methods for genome annotation and understanding regulatory elements.

He has authored over 260 peer-reviewed publications with >100,000 citations and advised numerous postdoctoral fellows and graduate students.

== Awards and recognition ==
- NSF CAREER Award
- Sloan Research Fellowship
- ISCB Innovator Award (2019)
- ISCB Fellow
- Highly Cited Researcher (Clarivate Analytics)
- Former member, Board of Directors, International Society for Computational Biology (ISCB)

== Personal life ==
Noble formerly used the name William Noble Grundy. His Erdős number is 3.
