= DNA-binding domain =

Self-stabilizing region of a protein that binds to specific DNA sequences

A DNA-binding domain (DBD) is an independently folded protein domain that contains at least one structural motif that recognizes double- or single-stranded DNA. A DBD can recognize a specific DNA sequence (a recognition sequence) or have a general affinity to DNA. Some DNA-binding domains may also include nucleic acids in their folded structure.

== Function ==
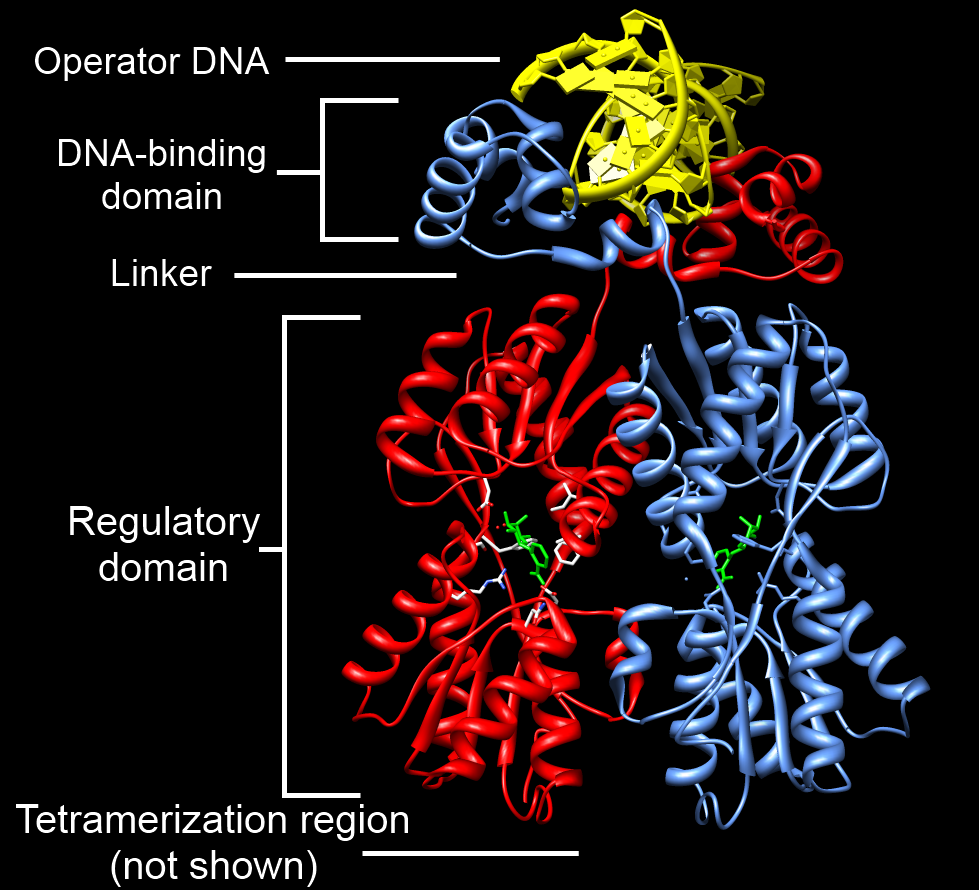
Example of a DNA-binding domain in the context of a protein. The N-terminal DNA-binding domain (labeled) of Lac repressor is regulated by a C-terminal regulatory domain (labeled). The regulatory domain binds an allosteric effector molecule (green). The allosteric response of the protein is communicated from the regulatory domain to the DNA binding domain through the linker region.

One or more DNA-binding domains are often part of a larger protein consisting of further protein domains with differing function. The extra domains often regulate the activity of the DNA-binding domain. The function of DNA binding is either structural or involves transcription regulation, with the two roles sometimes overlapping.

DNA-binding domains with functions involving DNA structure have biological roles in DNA replication, repair, storage, and modification, such as methylation.

Many proteins involved in the regulation of gene expression contain DNA-binding domains. For example, proteins that regulate transcription by binding DNA are called transcription factors. The final output of most cellular signaling cascades is gene regulation.

The DBD interacts with the nucleotides of DNA in a DNA sequence-specific or non-sequence-specific manner, but even non-sequence-specific recognition involves some sort of molecular complementarity between protein and DNA. DNA recognition by the DBD can occur at the major or minor groove of DNA, or at the sugar-phosphate DNA backbone (see the structure of DNA). Each specific type of DNA recognition is tailored to the protein's function. For example, the DNA-cutting enzyme DNAse I cuts DNA almost randomly and so must bind to DNA in a non-sequence-specific manner. But, even so, DNAse I recognizes a certain 3-D DNA structure, yielding a somewhat specific DNA cleavage pattern that can be useful for studying DNA recognition by a technique called DNA footprinting.

Many DNA-binding domains must recognize specific DNA sequences, such as DBDs of transcription factors that activate specific genes, or those of enzymes that modify DNA at specific sites, like restriction enzymes and telomerase. The hydrogen bonding pattern in the DNA major groove is less degenerate than that of the DNA minor groove, providing a more attractive site for sequence-specific DNA recognition.

The specificity of DNA-binding proteins can be studied using many biochemical and biophysical techniques, such as gel electrophoresis, analytical ultracentrifugation, calorimetry, DNA mutation, protein structure mutation or modification, nuclear magnetic resonance, x-ray crystallography, surface plasmon resonance, electron paramagnetic resonance, cross-linking and microscale thermophoresis (MST).

== DNA-binding protein in genomes ==
A large fraction of genes in each genome encodes DNA-binding proteins (see Table). However, only a rather small number of protein families are DNA-binding. For instance, more than 2000 of the ~20,000 human proteins are "DNA-binding", including about 750 zinc-finger proteins.

Species	DNA-binding proteins	DNA-binding families
Arabidopsis thaliana (thale cress)	4471	300
Saccharomyces cerevisiae (yeast)	720	243
Caenorhabditis elegans (worm)	2028	271
Drosophila melanogaster (fruit fly)	2620	283

== Types ==
DNA contacts of different types of DNA-binding domains

=== Helix-turn-helix ===
Originally discovered in bacteria, the helix-turn-helix motif is commonly found in repressor proteins and is about 20 amino acids long. In eukaryotes, the homeodomain comprises 2 helices, one of which recognizes the DNA (aka recognition helix). They are common in proteins that regulate developmental processes.

=== Helix-hairpin-helix ===
The helix-hairpin-helix is found in proteins that interact with DNA in a non-sequence-specific manner. It consists of two anti-parallel alpha-helices connected by a short hairpin loop. The two alpha-helices are packed at an acute angle of ~25–50° that dictates the characteristic pattern of hydrophobicity in the sequences, while other DNA-binding structures like the helix-turn-helix motif, which is also formed by a pair of helices, can be easily distinguished by the packing of the helices at an almost right angle.

=== Zinc finger ===
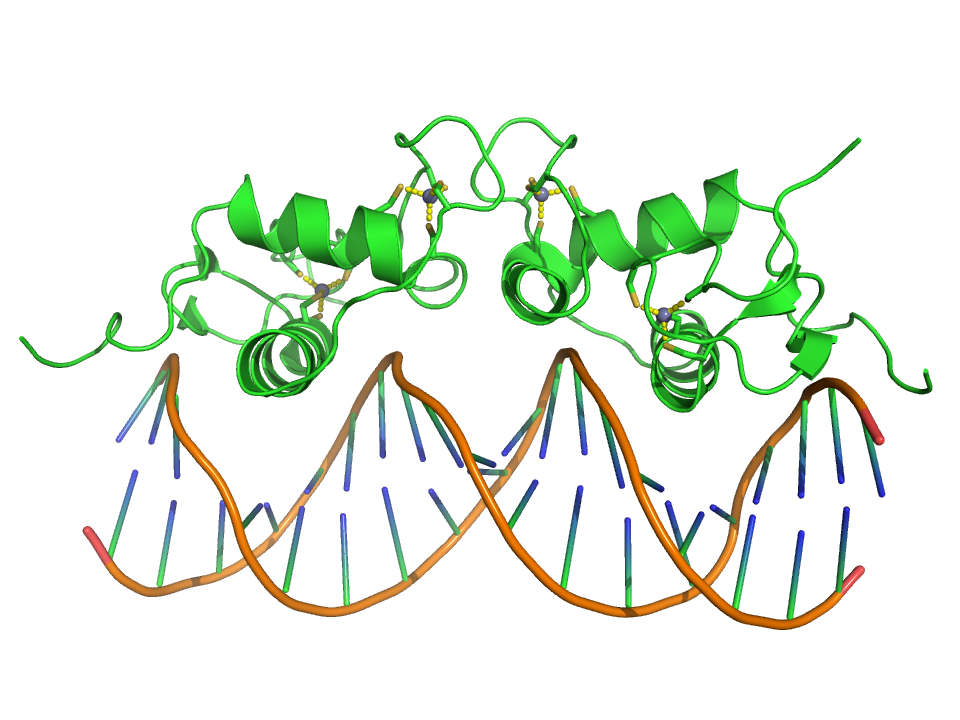
Crystallographic structure (PDB: 1R4O) of a dimer of the zinc finger containing DBD of the glucocorticoid receptor (top) bound to DNA (bottom). Zinc atoms are represented by grey spheres and the coordinating cysteine sidechains are depicted as sticks.

The zinc finger domain is mostly found in eukaryotes, but some examples have been found in bacteria. The zinc finger domain is generally between 23 and 28 amino acids long and is stabilized by coordinating zinc ions with regularly spaced zinc-coordinating residues (either histidines or cysteines). The most common class of zinc finger (Cys2His2) coordinates a single zinc ion and consists of a recognition helix and a 2-strand beta-sheet. In transcription factors these domains are often found in arrays (usually separated by short linker sequences) and adjacent fingers are spaced at 3 basepair intervals when bound to DNA.

=== Leucine zipper ===
The basic leucine zipper (bZIP) domain is found mainly in eukaryotes and to a limited extent in bacteria. The bZIP domain contains an alpha helix with a leucine at every 7th amino acid. If two such helices find one another, the leucines can interact as the teeth in a zipper, allowing dimerization of two proteins. When binding to the DNA, basic amino acid residues bind to the sugar-phosphate backbone while the helices sit in the major grooves. It regulates gene expression.

=== Winged helix ===
Consisting of about 110 amino acids, the winged helix (WH) domain has four helices and a two-strand beta-sheet.

=== Winged helix-turn-helix ===
The winged helix-turn-helix (wHTH) domain SCOP 46785 is typically 85-90 amino acids long. It is formed by a 3-helical bundle and a 4-strand beta-sheet (wing).

=== Helix-loop-helix ===
The basic helix-loop-helix (bHLH) domain is found in some transcription factors and is characterized by two alpha helices (α-helixes) connected by a loop. One helix is typically smaller and due to the flexibility of the loop, allows dimerization by folding and packing against another helix. The larger helix typically contains the DNA-binding regions.

=== HMG-box ===
HMG-box domains are found in high mobility group proteins which are involved in a variety of DNA-dependent processes like replication and transcription. They also alter the flexibility of the DNA by inducing bends. The domain consists of three alpha helices separated by loops.

=== Wor3 domain ===
Wor3 domains, named after the White–Opaque Regulator 3 (Wor3) in Candida albicans arose more recently in evolutionary time than most previously described DNA-binding domains and are restricted to a small number of fungi.

=== OB-fold domain ===
The OB-fold is a small structural motif originally named for its oligonucleotide/oligosaccharide binding properties. OB-fold domains range between 70 and 150 amino acids in length. OB-folds bind single-stranded DNA, and hence are single-stranded binding proteins.

OB-fold proteins have been identified as critical for DNA replication, DNA recombination, DNA repair, transcription, translation, cold shock response, and telomere maintenance.

== Unusual ==
=== Immunoglobulin fold ===
The immunoglobulin domain (InterPro: IPR013783) consists of a beta-sheet structure with large connecting loops, which serve to recognize either DNA major grooves or antigens. Usually found in immunoglobulin proteins, they are also present in Stat proteins of the cytokine pathway. This is likely because the cytokine pathway evolved relatively recently and has made use of systems that were already functional, rather than creating its own.

=== B3 domain ===
The B3 DBD (InterPro: IPR003340, SCOP 117343) is found exclusively in transcription factors from higher plants and restriction endonucleases EcoRII and BfiI and typically consists of 100-120 residues. It includes seven beta sheets and two alpha helices, which form a DNA-binding pseudobarrel protein fold.

=== TAL effector ===
TAL effectors are found in bacterial plant pathogens of the genus Xanthomonas and are involved in regulating the genes of the host plant in order to facilitate bacterial virulence, proliferation, and dissemination. They contain a central region of tandem 33-35 residue repeats and each repeat region encodes a single DNA base in the TALE's binding site. Within the repeat it is residue 13 alone that directly contacts the DNA base, determining sequence specificity, while other positions make contacts with the DNA backbone, stabilising the DNA-binding interaction. Each repeat within the array takes the form of paired alpha-helices, while the whole repeat array forms a right-handed superhelix, wrapping around the DNA-double helix. TAL effector repeat arrays have been shown to contract upon DNA binding and a two-state search mechanism has been proposed whereby the elongated TALE begins to contract around the DNA beginning with a successful Thymine recognition from a unique repeat unit N-terminal of the core TAL-effector repeat array. Related proteins are found in bacterial plant pathogen Ralstonia solanacearum, the fungal endosymbiont Burkholderia rhizoxinica and two as-yet unidentified marine-microorganisms. The DNA binding code and the structure of the repeat array is conserved between these groups, referred to collectively as the TALE-likes.

== See also ==
- For a structural classification of DNA-binding-domains presents in land plant genomes, see
- Comparison of nucleic acid simulation software
