= Ethylene-responsive element binding protein =

Protein family

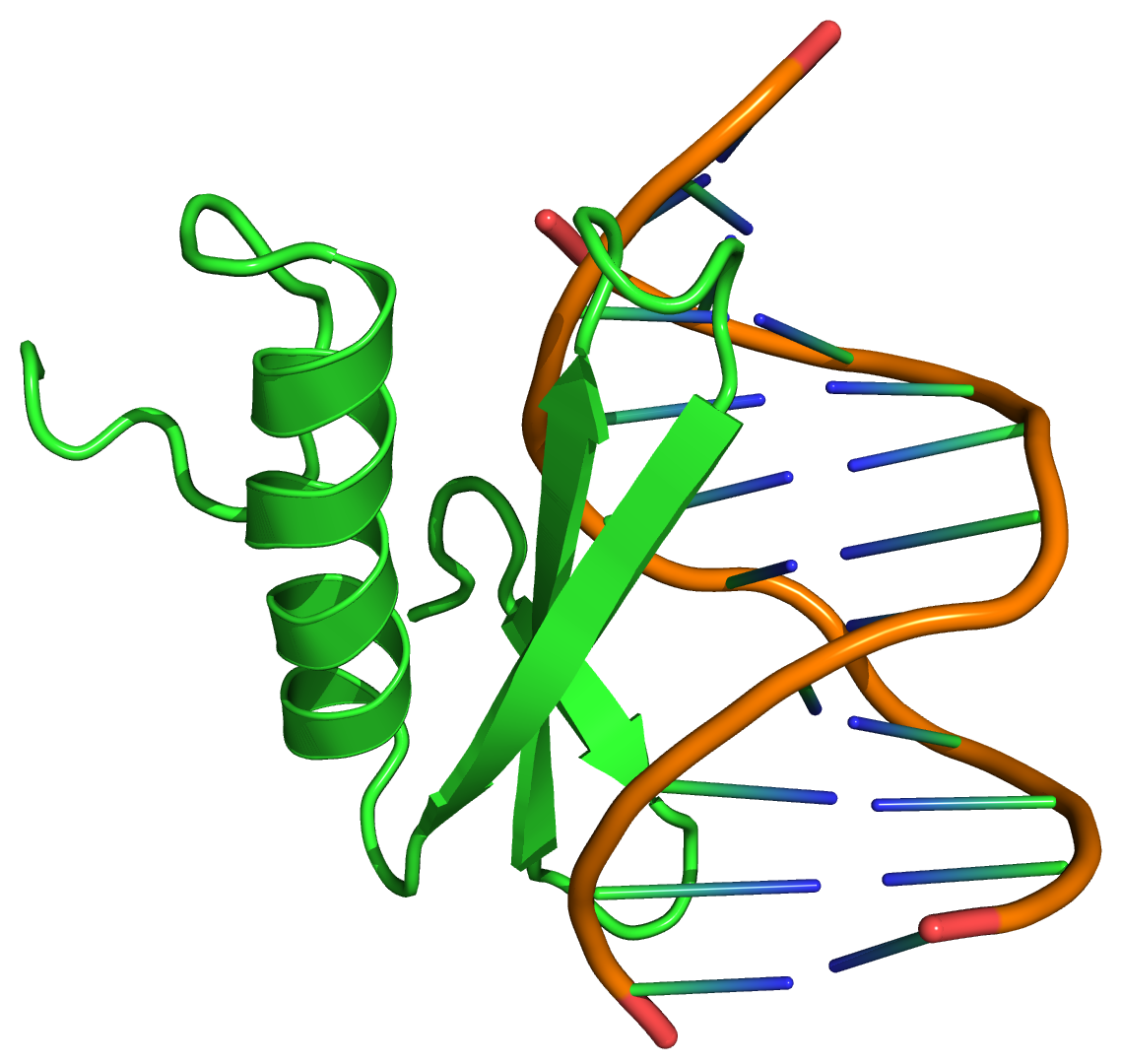
- NMR structure of the GCC-BOX binding domain of EREBP (green) complexed with DNA (brown) based on the PDB: 1GCC coordinates.

Identifiers
- Symbol: EREBP
- NCBI gene: 827464
- UniProt: O80337
Search for
- Structures: Swiss-model
- Domains: InterPro

AP2 domain
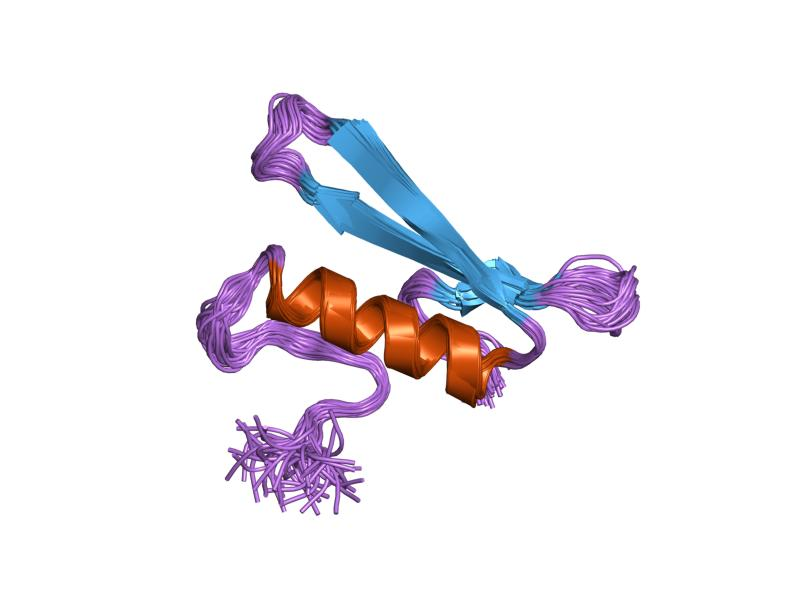
- Structure of the GCC-box binding domain.

Identifiers
- Symbol: AP2
- Pfam: PF00847
- Pfam clan: CL0081
- InterPro: IPR001471
- SMART: SM00380
- PROSITE: PS51032
- SCOP2: 3gcc / SCOPe / SUPFAM
Available protein structures:
- Pfam: structures / ECOD
- PDB: RCSB PDB; PDBe; PDBj
- PDBsum: structure summary
- PDB: 1GCC, 2GCC, 3GCC

Ethylene-responsive element binding protein (EREBP) is a homeobox gene from Arabidopsis thaliana and other plants which encodes a transcription factor. EREBP is responsible in part for mediating the response in plants to the plant hormone ethylene.
