= B3 domain =

DNA binding domain

B3 DNA binding domain
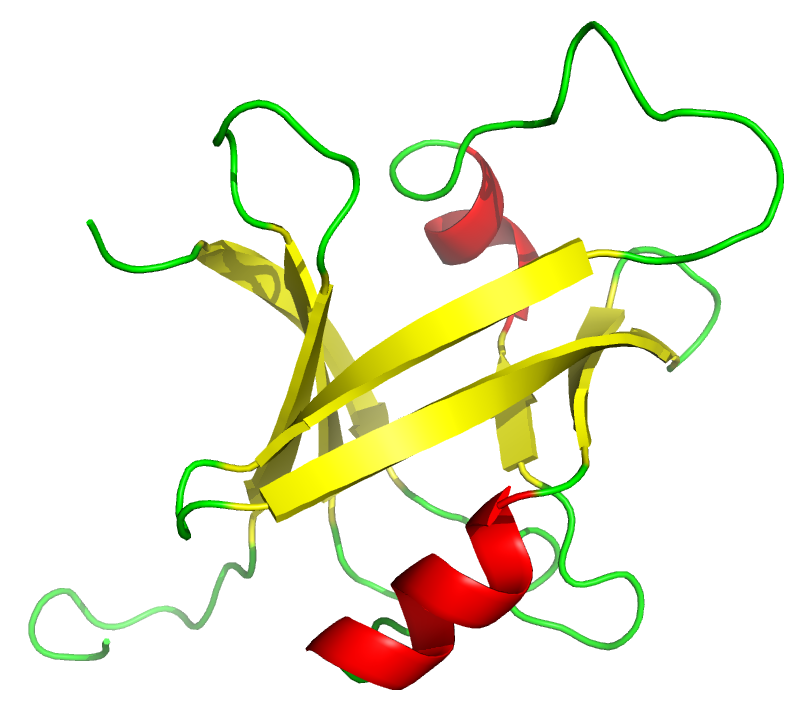
- B3 DNA binding domain of RAV1

Identifiers
- Symbol: B3_domain
- Pfam: PF02362
- InterPro: IPR003340
- PROSITE: PS50863
- SCOP2: 1wid / SCOPe / SUPFAM
- CDD: cd10017
Available protein structures:
- PDB: 1wid, 1yel IPR003340 PF02362 (ECOD; PDBsum)
- AlphaFold: IPR003340; PF02362

The B3 DNA binding domain (DBD) is a highly conserved domain found exclusively in transcription factors (≥40 species) (Pfam PF02362) combined with other domains (InterPro: IPR003340). It consists of 100-120 residues, includes seven beta strands and two alpha helices that form a DNA-binding pseudobarrel protein fold (SCOP 117343); it interacts with the major groove of DNA.

== B3 families ==
In Arabidopsis thaliana, there are three main families of transcription factors that contain B3 domain:

- ARF (Auxin Response Factors)
- ABI3 (ABscisic acid Insensitive3)
- RAV (Related to ABI3/VP1)

protein	ARF1-B3	ABI3-B3	RAV1-B3
B3 structure derived by	molecular model	molecular model	NMR
B3 recognition sequence	TGTCTC	CATGCA	CACCTG

PDB: 1WID and PDB: 1YEL are only known NMR solution phase structures of the B3 DNA Binding Domain.

== Related proteins ==
The N-terminal domain of restriction endonuclease EcoRII; the C-terminal domain of restriction endonuclease BfiI possess a similar DNA-binding pseudobarrel protein fold.

== See also ==
- Restriction endonuclease EcoRII
- Auxin
- Abscisic acid
