= Fancy rat =

- A black hooded fancy rat

Conservation status
- Domesticated

Scientific classification
- Kingdom: Animalia
- Phylum: Chordata
- Class: Mammalia
- Order: Rodentia
- Family: Muridae
- Genus: Rattus
- Species: R. norvegicus
- Subspecies: R. n. domestica

Trinomial name
- Rattus norvegicus domestica (Berkenhout, 1769)

Domesticated brown rat subspecies

The fancy rat (Rattus norvegicus domestica) is the domesticated form of Rattus norvegicus, the brown rat, and the most common species of rat kept as a pet. The name fancy rat derives from the use of the adjective fancy for a hobby, also seen in "animal fancy", a hobby involving the appreciation, promotion, or breeding of pet or domestic animals. The offspring of wild-caught brown rats, having become docile after having been bred for many generations, fall under the fancy type.

Fancy rats were originally targets for blood sport in 18th- and 19th-century Europe. Later bred as pets, they now come in a wide variety of coat colors and patterns, and are bred and raised by several rat enthusiast groups around the world. They are sold by breeders and in pet stores, and they are also often available at animal shelters.

Fancy rats are quite independent, affectionate, loyal and easily trained. They are often considered more intelligent than other domesticated rodents. Healthy fancy rats typically live 2 to 3 years.

Fancy rats are used widely in medical research, as their physiology is similar to human physiology. When used in this field, they are referred to as laboratory rats (lab rats).

Domesticated rats are physiologically and psychologically different from their wild relatives and typically pose no more of a health risk than other common pets. For example, domesticated brown rats are not considered a disease threat, although exposure to wild rat populations could introduce pathogens like the bacteria Streptobacillus moniliformis into the home. Fancy rats have different health risks from their wild counterparts, and thus are unlikely to succumb to the same illnesses as wild rats.

== History ==
The Silk Scroll of Three Rats, painted by the Xuande Emperor between 1425–1435 CE, compared to a modern Lobund-Wistar rat photographed by Janet Stephens.

An illustration of rats or mice in Yoso-Tama-No-Kakehashi, Vol. II, 1775.

At some point between 1425 and 1435 CE, the Xuande Emperor painted three rats that appear to have been pets. Two of them are eating lychee, noted by Peng et al. as "an expensive fruit only produced in remote South China," and one of them is wearing a collar and chain. Peng et al. go on to speculate that domesticated rats may have spread alongside wild rats "during the Ming treasure voyages and subsequent maritime trades."

Another early artifact of rat-keeping comes from 18th-century Japan, in the form of Yoso-tama-no-kakehashi ("A bridge to obtaining novel jewel-like nezumi"), a care and breeding guide written by "the owner of Shunpo-do" in 1775 and examined by researcher Takashi Kuramoto in 2011. Although the word "nezumi" can also refer to mice, Kuramoto concludes that the guide uses it throughout to refer specifically to rats.

The rat-catchers of the 18th and 19th centuries are thought to have been instrumental in the foundation of the European fancy. The rat-catchers would either kill the rats, or, more likely, sell them to be used in blood sport. Rat-baiting was a popular sport until the beginning of the 20th century. It involved filling a pit with several rats and then placing bets on how long it would take a terrier to kill them all. It is believed that both rat-catchers and sportsmen began to keep certain, odd-colored rats during the height of the sport, eventually breeding them and then selling them as pets.

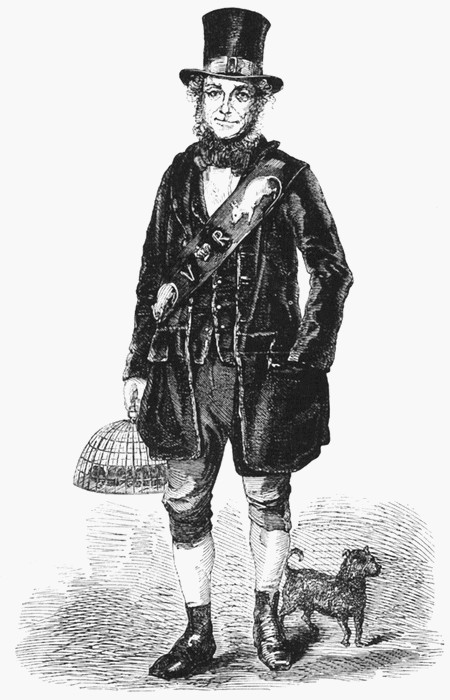
Jack Black made his living not only from catching rats, but also from selling them for use in baiting.

The two men thought to have formed the basis of the European rat fancy are Jack Black, self-proclaimed rat-catcher to Queen Victoria, and Jimmy Shaw, manager of one of the largest sporting public houses in London. These two men are responsible for beginning many of the color varieties present today. Black, specifically, was known for taming the "prettier" rats of unusual color, decorating them with ribbons, and selling them as pets.

Rat fancy as a formal, organized hobby in Europe began when a woman named Mary Douglas asked for permission to bring her pet rats to an exhibition of the National Mouse Club at the Aylesbury Town Show in England on October 24, 1901. Her black-and-white hooded rat won "Best in Show" and ignited interest in the area. After Douglas' death in 1921, European rat fancy soon began to fall back out of fashion. The hobby formally lasted from 1912 to 1929 or 1931, as part of the National Mouse and Rat Club, at which point Rat was dropped from the name, returning it to the original National Mouse Club. The hobby was revived in 1976 with the formation of the English National Fancy Rat Society (NFRS).

== Differences from wild rats ==
While domesticated rats are not removed enough from their wild counterparts to justify a distinct species (like the dog versus grey wolf), there are significant differences that set them apart: the most apparent is coloring. Random color mutations may occur in the wild, but these are rare. Most wild R. norvegicus are a dark brown color called "agouti", while fancy rats may be anything from white to cinnamon to blue.

Behaviorally, domesticated pet rats are tamer than those in the wild. They are more comfortable around humans and known to seek out their owners while roaming freely. They have decreased reactions to light and sound, are less cautious of new food, and have better tolerance to overcrowding. Domesticated rats are shown to mate earlier, more readily, and for a longer period of time over their lifespan. Also, domesticated rats exhibit different behaviors when fighting with each other: while wild rats almost always flee a lost battle, caged rats spend protracted amounts of time in a belly-up or boxing position. These behavioral traits are thought to be products of environment as opposed to genetics. However, it is also theorized that there are certain underlying biological reasons for why some members of a wild species are more receptive to domestication than others, and that these differences are then passed down to offspring (compare domesticated silver fox).

The body structure of domesticated rats differs from that of a wild rat as well. The body of a fancy rat is smaller, with larger ears and a longer tail. Domesticated rats have generally smaller and sharper facial features as well.

Domesticated rats have a longer lifespan than that of wild rats. Because domesticated rats are protected from predators and have ready access to food, water, shelter, and medical care, their average lifespan is around two to three years, in contrast to wild R. norvegicus, which average a lifespan of less than one year. However, wild rats generally have larger brains, hearts, livers, kidneys, and adrenal glands than laboratory rats.

The fancy rat and wild rat also largely face different health concerns; for example, fancy rats may be at risk of developing a pneumococcal infection from exposure to humans, while wild rats may harbor tapeworms after coming in contact with carriers such as cockroaches and fleas.

== Health ==
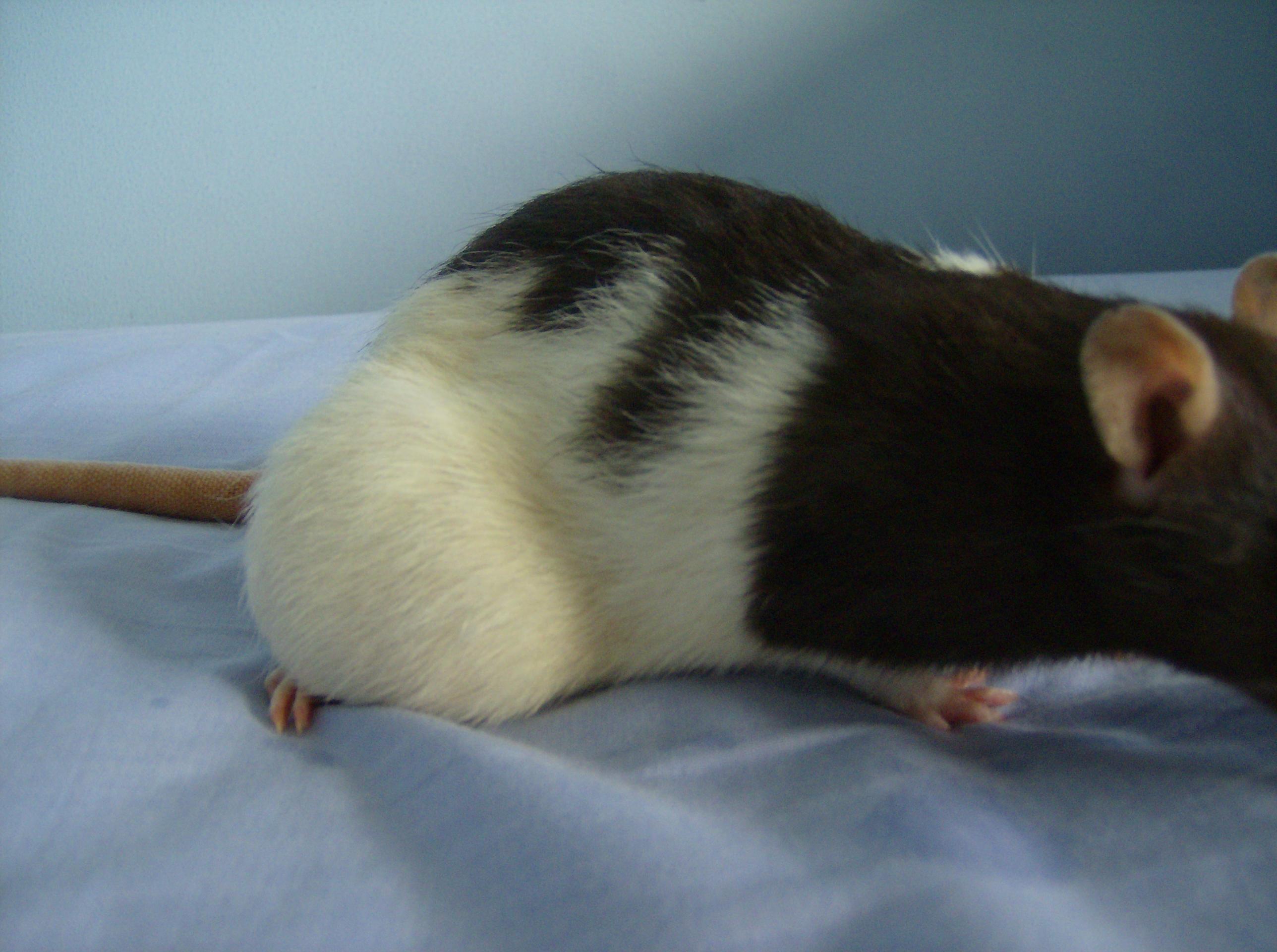
Fancy rats of both sexes commonly develop mammary tumors as they age. These are usually benign, but multiple tumors can persist even after removal.

While living indoors decreases the risk of contracting certain diseases, living in close quarters with other rats, lack of proper protection from environmental factors (e.g. temperature, humidity), an unhealthy diet, and the stresses inherently associated with living in an unnatural habitat can all adversely affect a rat's health to make them more prone to specific conditions.

Fancy rats' susceptibility to disease can thus be impacted by exposure; stress; living conditions, including rat companionship; and diet.

Accordingly, like other animals, a fancy rat's health may benefit from access to veterinary care, a well-balanced and rat-specific diet, proper living conditions, and adequate enrichment.

=== Common concerns ===
==== Excess porphyrin ====
Porphyrin is a brown-red, mucus-like substance which may look like dried blood that fancy rats secrete around the eyes and nose. An excess amount of porphyrin, called chromodacryorrhea, generally indicates stress, injury, or illness (especially respiratory infections). It may also be caused by temporary irritation in the eye, such as an accidental scratch.

==== Respiratory disease ====
Fancy rats often suffer from bacterial and/or viral respiratory infections, including murine respiratory mycoplasmosis (MRM, caused by Mycoplasma pulmonis), rat coronavirus (RCV, particularly the SDAV strain), and Sendai virus.

MRM, also known as "chronic respiratory disease" (CRD), is common among pet rats but very rare in laboratory rats, who are generally bred to be specific pathogen-free. The bacteria causing MRM among pet rats, Mycoplasma pulmonis, are transmitted via aerosol, direct contact, and in utero; thus, infection generally begins at birth and persists for the rat's life. Approximately 70% to 100% of pet rats test positive for Mycoplasma, though many do not display symptoms of MRM until they are older, if at all. Earlier MRM symptoms may include "snuffling". sneezing, and excess porphyrin. Advanced MRM symptoms include shortness of breath, crackling sounds while breathing, weight loss, hunched posture, and ruffled coat.

==== Neoplasia ====
Fancy rats are predisposed to both benign and malignant (cancerous) neoplasms.

Fancy rats very frequently develop mammary gland tumors and pituitary gland tumors, especially if they are intact females and/or are fed high-calorie diets Female rats spayed at a young age are significantly less likely to develop mammary and pituitary tumors than intact females.

Most mammary tumors are benign (fibroadenomas); less than 10% are malignant (adenocarcinomas). As long as the rat is an acceptable anesthetic candidate, veterinarians generally consider the surgical removal of mammary tumors to be beneficial due to improved welfare. However, mammary tumors are known to frequently recur.

Pituitary tumors affect over 80% of some strains of laboratory rats older than 24 months. They are generally benign (adenomas) and cause neurological symptoms that worsen over time. One study found that pituitary tumors affected ~5% of female rats spayed between 5–7 months old versus ~74% of intact females.

==== Kidney disease ====
Chronic progressive nephropathy (CPN) is a common renal disease in older rats, especially males.

=== Lesser concerns ===
Mites are microscopic bloodsucking parasites that can irritate the skin of fancy rats, and if they have a preexisting health condition, it can cause them to die from their bodies' inability to handle two problems at once.

Rats may also develop ringtail if kept in areas with low humidity or high temperatures. Staphylococcus spp. are a mostly benign group of bacteria that commonly reside on the top of the skin, but cuts and scratches from social and hierarchical fighting can open up the pathways for them to cause ulcerative dermatitis.

Fancy rats generally avoid disease-causing bacteria such as Salmonella and Pseudomonas aeruginosa; the latter is absent in treated water. They may also more easily avoid vectors like cockroaches, beetles, and fleas which are essential for the spread of endemic typhus and intestinal parasites like the rat tapeworm.

Tyzzer's disease, protozoic infections (e.g. Giardia muris), and pseudotuberculosis are usually seen in stressed or young rats. Additionally, pet rats are exposed to Streptococcus pneumoniae, a zoonotic disease caught from humans, not the same bacteria associated with pneumonia. A human-associated fungus, Pneumocystis jirovecii (also found in almost all domesticated animals), is usually asymptomatic in the rat, unless the rat's immune system is compromised by illness. If this occurs, the infection can develop into pneumonia.

Rats may develop bumblefoot if kept inside a wire cage or if their cage is not cleaned frequently. This manifests as ulcers on the soles of their feet and may require antibiotic treatment. To prevent this, rats should not walk on wire flooring and should be kept in a clean environment.

=== Veterinary care ===
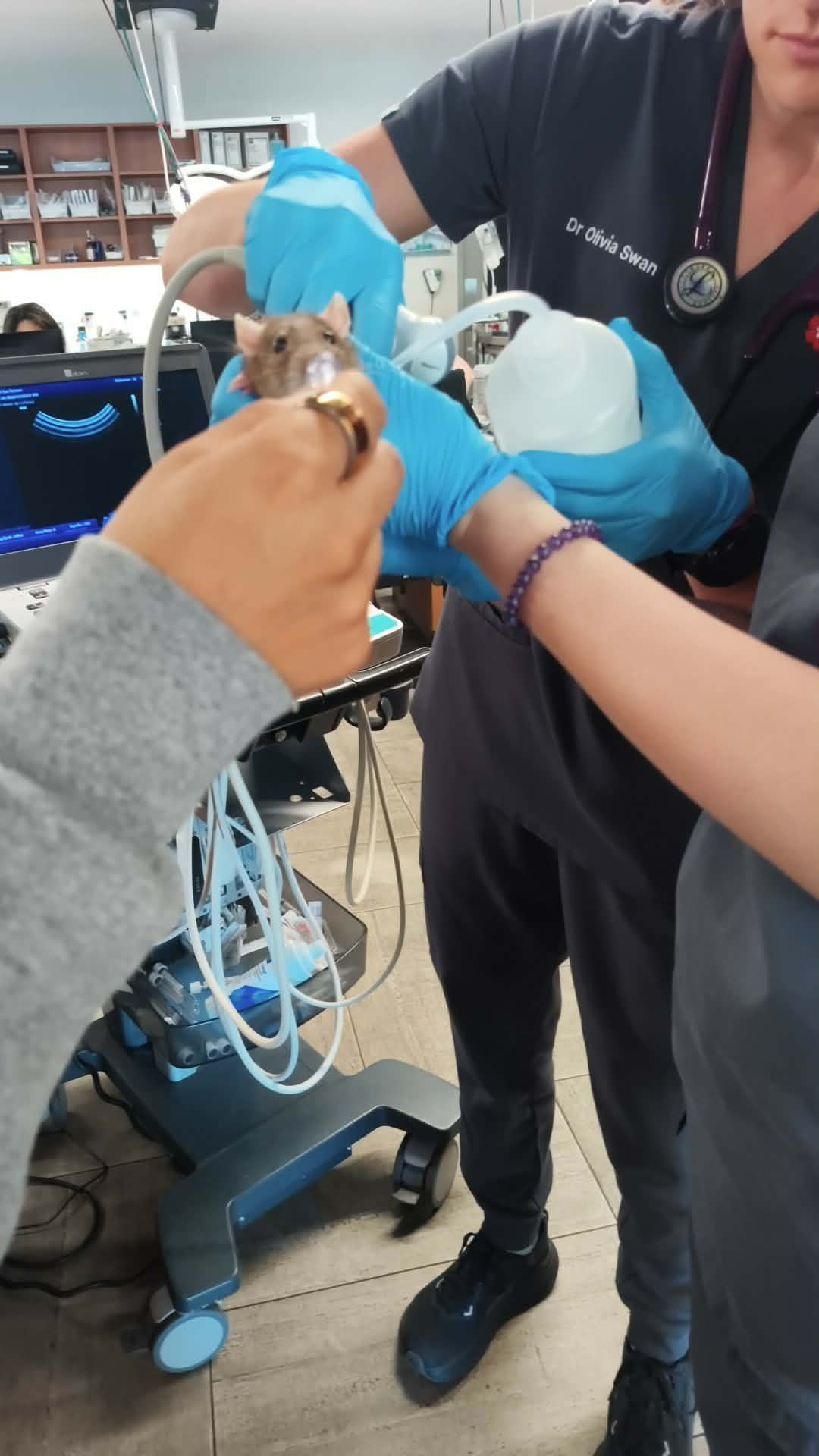
A veterinarian examining a pet rat during a clinical visit

Pet rats require access to veterinary care, preferably from veterinarians experienced in exotic animal or small mammal medicine. Not all general practice veterinarians are trained in rat medicine, so owners are often advised to seek specialists.

Common veterinary procedures for rats include:

- Physical examinations and wellness checks
- Treatment of respiratory infections (the most common health issue in pet rats)
- Tumor removal surgery, particularly mammary tumors
- Dental care for overgrown or misaligned incisors
- Treatment of skin conditions and parasites
- Emergency care for injuries or acute illness

Anesthesia in rats requires specialized knowledge due to their small size and unique respiratory anatomy. Isoflurane gas anesthesia is commonly used for surgical procedures.

Early detection of illness is important, as rats often hide symptoms until disease is advanced. Owners should monitor for signs such as labored breathing, lethargy, weight loss, porphyrin discharge around the eyes or nose, or changes in behavior.

=== Zoonotic risks ===
Many believe that pet rats may transmit diseases to their owners, but this is not typically true. Usually, rats bred as pets are tested and treated for diseases and parasites.

One fear may be that rats carry plague, but R. norvegicus is not among the list of species considered a threat in the Western US.

Rat-bite fever is a rare disease among domesticated rats, most often found in rats from large chain pet stores that breed their stock of rats in masses (usually for snake food rather than as pets) or from breeders with neglectful rat husbandry. This disease is fairly unnoticeable in the rat, but is characterized in humans by swelling of the rat bite or scratch site, fever, vomiting, and body aches. It is contracted by the bite or scratch of an infected rat. As an early breeder of fancy rats, nineteenth-century rat catcher Jack Black recounted that he nearly died several times after bites.

In 2004, an outbreak of salmonella in the United States was connected to people who owned pet rats. However, it has been determined that a pet rat's initial exposure to salmonella, along with many other zoonotic rat diseases, typically indicates exposure to wild rodent populations, either from an infestation in the owner's home, or from the pet's contaminated food, water, or bedding.

In 2017, the Centers for Disease Control reported an outbreak of Seoul virus spread by pet rats.

== Varieties ==
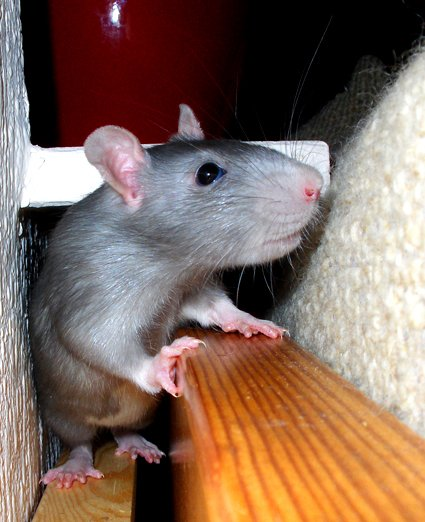
The American Blue is one of several standardized coat colors

As in other pet species, a variety of colors, coat types, and other features that do not appear in the wild have either been developed, or have appeared spontaneously. Fancy rats do not have distinctive breeds. Any individual rat may be defined one or more ways by its color, coat, marking, and non-standard body type. This allows for very specific classifications such as a ruby-eyed cinnamon Berkshire rex Dumbo.

=== Coloring ===
While some pet rats retain the agouti coloring of the wild brown rat (three tones on the same hair), others have solid colors (a single color on each hair), a trait derived from rats with black coats. Agouti-based colors include agouti, cinnamon, and fawn. Black-based colors include black, beige, blue, and chocolate.

Eye color is considered a subset of coloring, and coat color definitions often include standards for the eyes, as many genes which control eye color will also affect the coat color or vice versa. The American Fancy Rat and Mouse Association (AFRMA) lists black, pink, ruby, and odd-eyed (two differently colored eyes) as possible eye colors, depending on the variety of rat shown. Ruby refers to eyes which at a glance appear black, but on closer observation are a deep, dark red.

Color names can vary for more vaguely defined varieties, like lilac and fawn, while the interpretations of standards can fluctuate between (and even within) different countries or clubs.

=== Markings ===
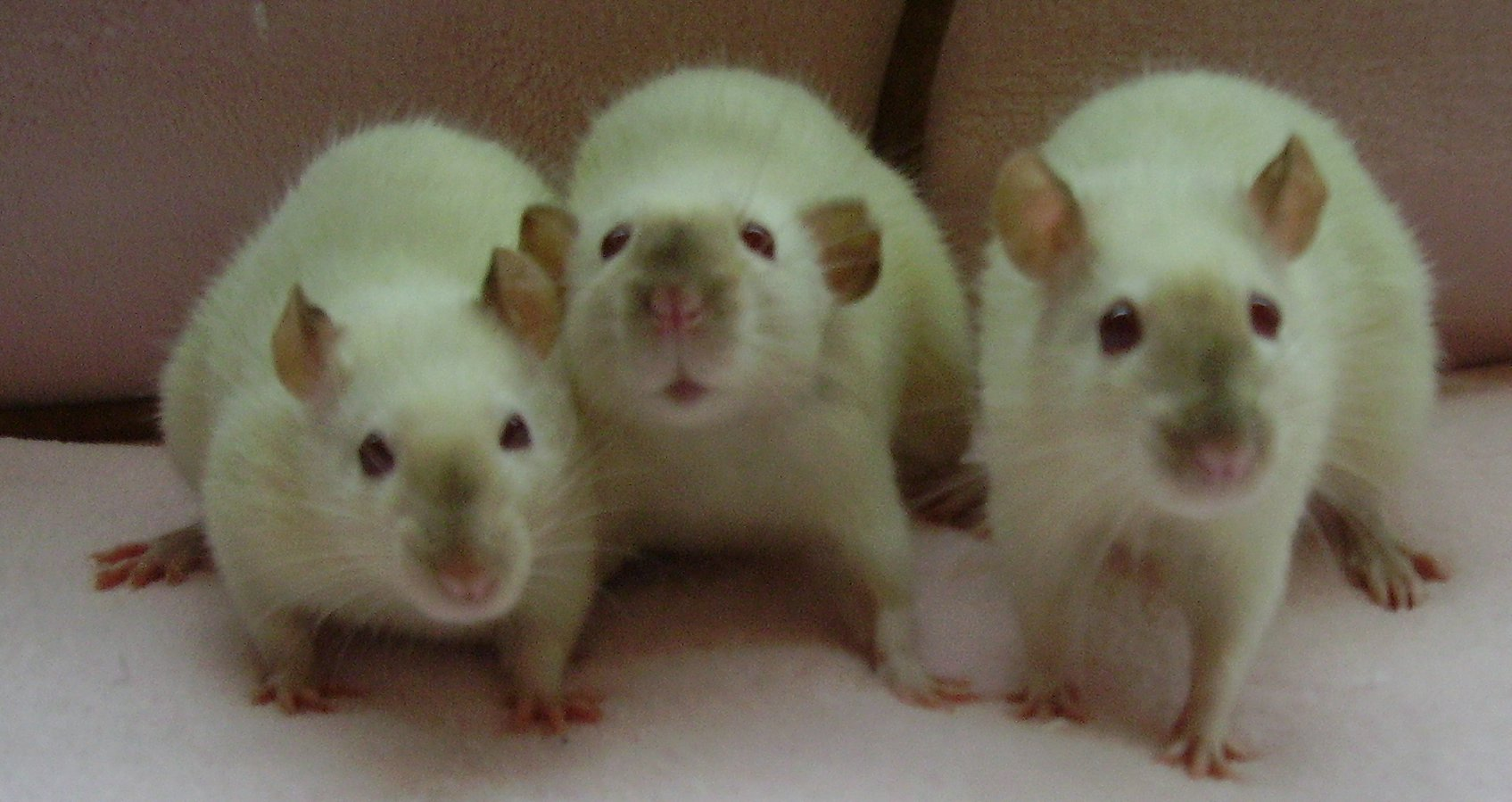
Himalayan rats have a unique color and marking variation

Further dividing the varieties of fancy rats are the many different markings. Fancy rats can appear in any combination of colors and markings. The markings are typically in reference to the patterns and ratios of colored hair versus white hair. Two extremes would be a self (completely solid, non-white color) and a Himalayan (completely white except blending into colored areas at the nose and feet, called points, as in a Himalayan cat's markings).

Markings have a strict standard, with detailed terminology, for showing in fancy rat pet shows. However, many domestic rats are not closely bred to any color standard; many of those found in pet shops will have mismarkings from a formal breeding perspective, which are defined as variations in markings that are not recognized as conforming to a breed standard published by a rat fancier organisation.

Commonly recognized standards include:

- Berkshire – colored top, white belly
- Hooded – color runs in a saddle, a single, unbroken line from the full head down to the spine and possibly partly down the tail
- Capped – color on the full head only
- Blazed – colored head (capped) or body (Irish, Berkshire or self) with a triangular wedge of white fur over the face.
- Variegated – any form of mismatched oddities in the fur. Can be anything from a broken or spotted hood to a misshaped blaze.
- Irish or English Irish – In England, the Irish is standardized by the NFRS as an equilateral triangle of white with a side that begins at the chest, or between the front legs, and where the point ends mid-length. In the United States and elsewhere, clubs like the AFRMA distinguish this marking as the English Irish and allow for another standardized Irish in which the rat may have white of an even or symmetrical nature anywhere along its underside.

Other marking varieties include spotted or Dalmatian (named for the spotted Dalmatian dog), Essex, masked, Himalayan (typically a gradient of color along the body, darkest at the base of the tail and nose as in Siamese cats), and Down Under or Downunder (an Australian variety that has a solid color stripe on the belly or a color marking there that corresponds to the markings on the top).

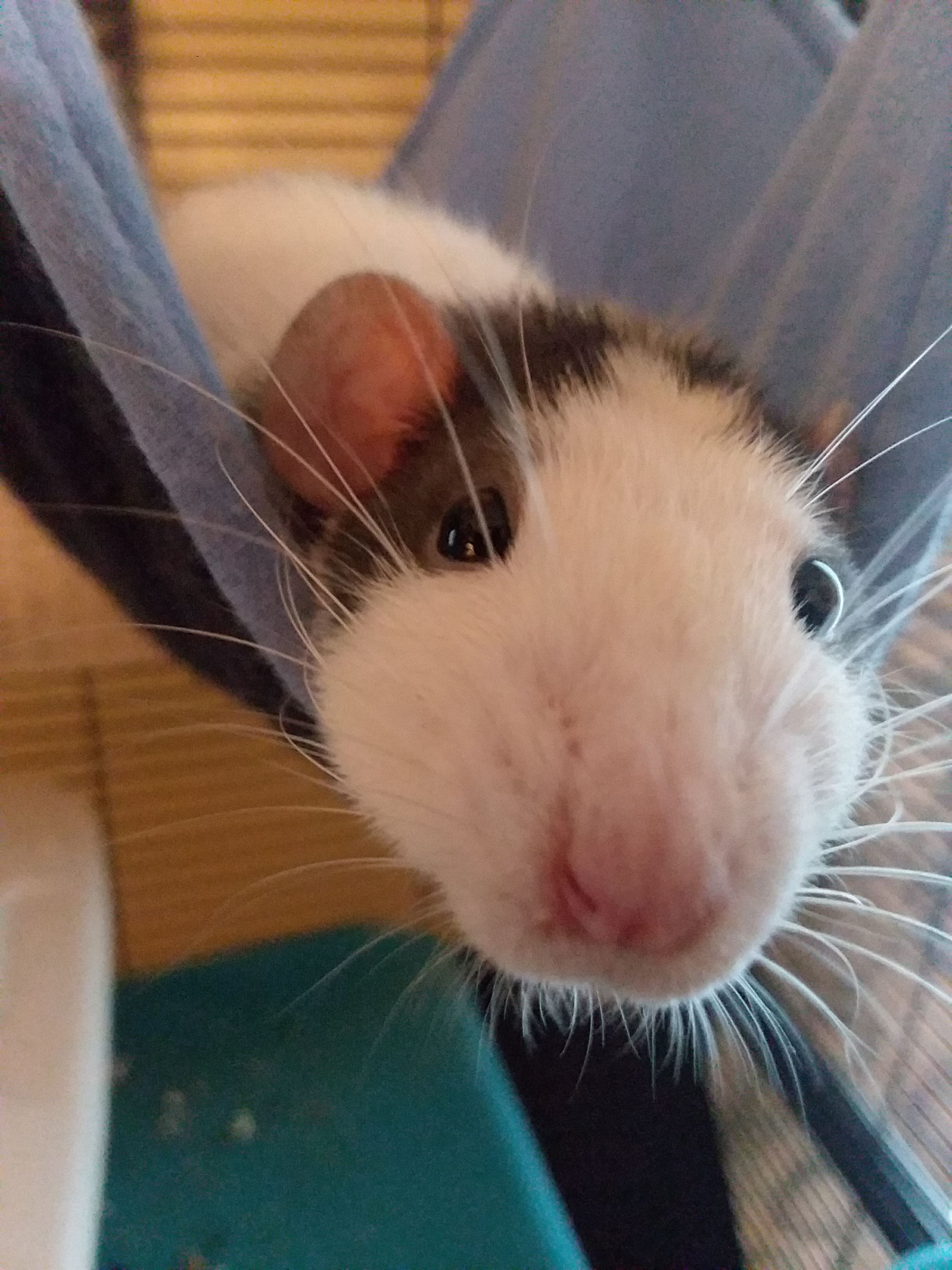
Dalmatian Fancy Rat

=== Ear and body type ===
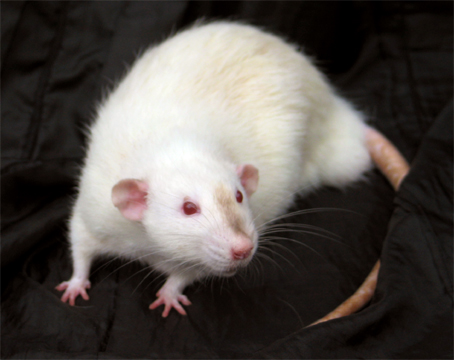
A male Dumbo rat, a variety with ears placed lower on the head

Some prominent and standardized physical changes applied to rats through selective breeding are the development of the dumbo rat, dwarf rat, and Manx rat.

The dumbo rat, whose origins are in the United States, is characterized by having large, low, round ears on the sides of its head, versus the smaller and less prominent ears seen on a standard eared rat. Dumbo ears are caused by a recessive mutation and named for their resemblance to the fictional character Dumbo the Flying Elephant.

Another body type variation that has risen to prominence more recently in the hobby is the Dwarf rat. Dwarfism arose as a mutation among Sprague-Dawley rats kept for research in the 1970s. Adult dwarfs are considerably smaller than their standard counterparts, with males between 100 and 130g as opposed to 300g or more. This strain of dwarfism is caused by reduced production of growth hormone, and this has other effects in addition to changed overall body size. Important for pet-keeping, it reduces the incidence of pituitary and mammary tumours and nephropathy (kidney disease), with the result that Dwarf rats live 20–40% longer in males and 10–20% longer in females than their standard counterparts. However, they may also show some cognitive impairment.

The Manx rat is tailless due to a genetic mutation, and was named for the Manx cat which shares this feature, though not necessarily due to the same mutation. Breeding Manx rats does raise some ethical and health concerns however, as rats use their tails for both balance and thermoregulation.

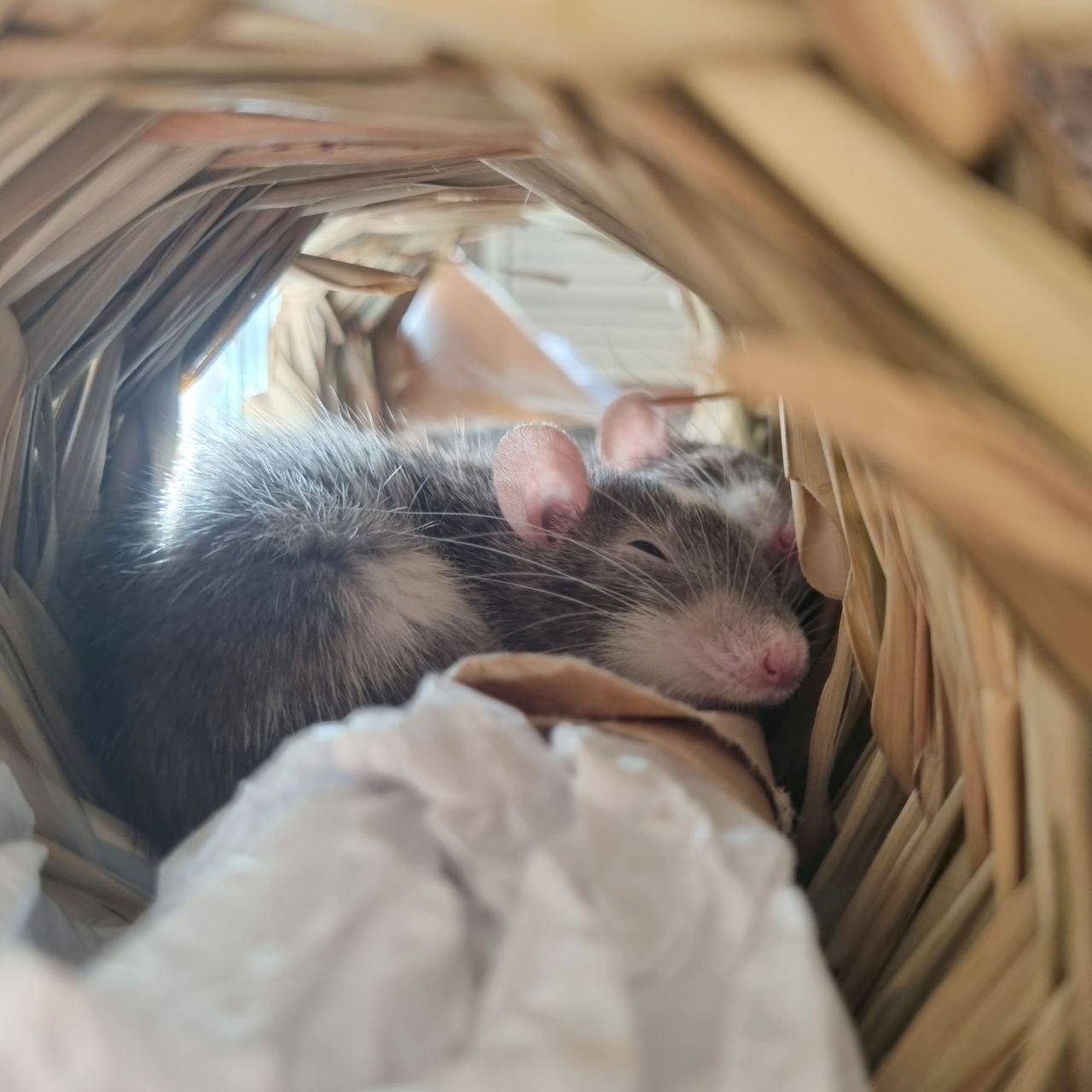
Two Dwarf rats sleeping. Dwarf fancy rats are much smaller than standards.

=== Coat types ===
There is a relatively small variety of coats compared to the number of colors and markings, and not all are internationally standardized. The most common type is the normal or standard, which is allowed variance in coarseness between the sexes; males have a coarse, thick, rough coat, while females' coats are softer and finer. Other standardized coats include: rex, in which all the hairs are curly, even the whiskers; velveteen, a softer variation of the rex; satin or silky coat, which is extra-soft and fine, with a sheen; and Harley, characterized by wispy long straight hairs. Remaining coat types are not defined by the hair itself, but rather by the lack of it, such as hairless rats.

==== Hairless rats ====
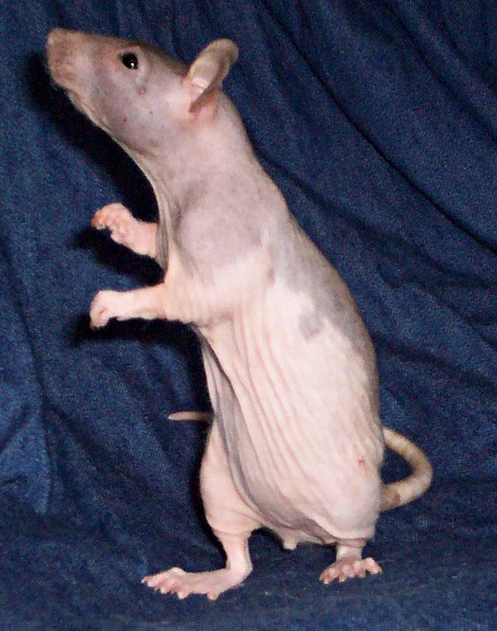
Even though this rat is hairless, pigmentation indicates that it is a hooded rat.

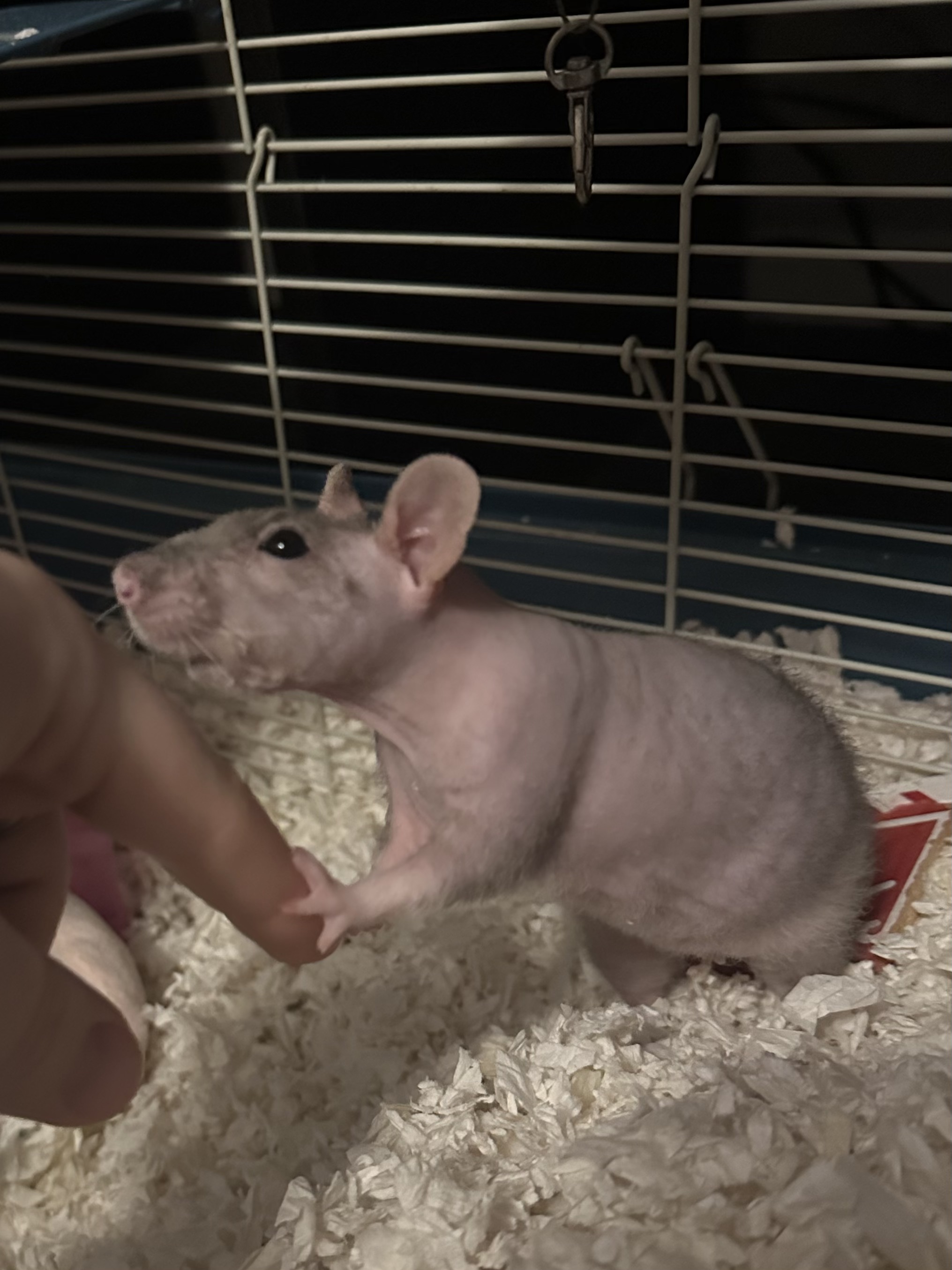
This is an example of a semi-hairless rat with sparse patches of hair on the head, forelimbs, and back.

Hairless rats are a coat variety characterized by varying levels of hair loss. One type of hairless rat is bred from curly-coated rexes. These range from having areas of very short fur to being completely bald. Since rex is a dominant trait, there only needs to be one rex parent to produce curly rex-coated offspring. However, when two rex parents are bred, two copies of the trait may be present in the offspring. This causes varying levels of hairlessness, and has earned the colloquial name "double rex". The other type of hairless rat is sometimes referred to as a "true hairless". This is caused by a different gene, and is distinguishable from a hairless double rex by the absence of whiskers. Unlike a double rex, this type of hairless rat is incapable of growing hairs on any part of the body. One additional subset of semi-hairless rats, patchwork rex, constantly lose their hair and regrow it in different "patches" several times throughout their life. Hairless rats may be prone to more health problems than their standard- or rex-coated counterparts, including a reduced tolerance for cold, kidney and liver failure, more prone to skin injury, skin conditions, and shortened life span.

=== Ethics of selective breeding ===
There is controversy among rat fanciers in regard to selective breeding. On one hand, breeding rats to "conform" to a specific standard or to develop a new one is a large part of what the fancy was founded on. On the other hand, the process results in many rats who do not "conform", and are then either given away, sold as food for reptiles, or killed—the latter referred to as culling.

There are concerns as to whether breeding hairless and tailless rats is ethical. Hairless rats are less protected from scratches and the cold without their coat. Groups such as the NFRS prohibit the showing of these varieties at their events and forbid advertisement through affiliated services. The tail is vital for rats' balance and for adjusting body temperature. Tailless rats have greater risk of heat exhaustion, poor bowel and bladder control, falling from heights, and can be at risk for life-threatening deformities in the pelvic region, like hind leg paralysis and megacolon.

=== Availability ===
In many countries, pet rats are now commonly available from breeders and pet stores (although there is debate among rat enthusiasts regarding the ethical treatment and quality of life provided by such stores) and there exist several rat fancier groups worldwide. Such rats are also often available in animal shelters.

Because R. norvegicus and related species are seen as pests, their intentional import into foreign countries is often regulated. For example, the importation of foreign rodents is prohibited in Australia, and so various coat types, colors, and varieties have been bred separately from foreign lines, or are just not obtainable within that country (for example, hairless and Dumbo rats do not exist in Australia). In other areas, like the Canadian province of Alberta, which is considered rat-free, the ownership of domestic fancy rats outside of schools, laboratories, and zoos is illegal.

== In media ==
Samantha Martin, a professional animal trainer for films, commercials, and music videos, has claimed that rats are one of the easiest animals to train due to their adaptability, intelligence, and focus.

In the direct-to-video sequels to the 1987 film The Brave Little Toaster, The Brave Little Toaster to the Rescue and The Brave Little Toaster Goes to Mars, Ratso is the pet rat of Rob McGroarty.

The novella Ratman's Notebooks by Stephen Gilbert was the basis for the films Willard (1971) and Ben (1972), and a 2003 remake of the first film. Here, the protagonist befriends the rats found in his home and builds up a close relationship, only to have it end tragically. While these movies generally emphasize the popular perception of malevolence—they kill people and cats and ransack grocery stores—other wild rats who become pets are portrayed in more neutral to positive ways; the television show, House, briefly featured "Steve McQueen", the pet rat of the titular character.

In certain versions of the Teenage Mutant Ninja Turtles franchise, the master and adoptive father of the turtles is Splinter, who was once the pet rat of ninja Hamato Yoshi and learned his martial arts skills by imitating his owner.

In the 1996 point-and-click adventure game Phantasmagoria: A Puzzle of Flesh, the protagonist Curtis Craig owns a pet rat named Blob, which is seen various times in the game and is even involved in one of the many puzzles that the player must decipher.

Pet rats are unofficially allowed at Hogwarts School of Witchcraft and Wizardry in the Harry Potter series, but are not generally seen as desirable pets. Ronald Weasley has a pet rat, Scabbers, who was later revealed to be an illegal animagus named Peter Pettigrew in reality.

Christopher Boone, the autistic protagonist of The Curious Incident of the Dog in the Night-Time has a pet rat named Toby.

Roddy St. James (voiced by Hugh Jackman), the main character in the DreamWorks animated film Flushed Away, is a fancy rat kept as a pet by a family in Kensington, London.

In Jerry Spinelli's Stargirl, the titular character owns a pet rat named Cinnamon.

== See also ==
- List of rats
- Rat
- Brown rat
- Laboratory rat
- Biobreeding rat
- Knockout rat
- Rat variety
- Rat Park
- Animal testing
- Animal testing on rodents
- Working rat
- Rat agility
- Rat Genome Database
- Experimental evolution
- List of fictional rodents
- Fancy mouse
