= Rattie Ratz =

American nonprofit organization

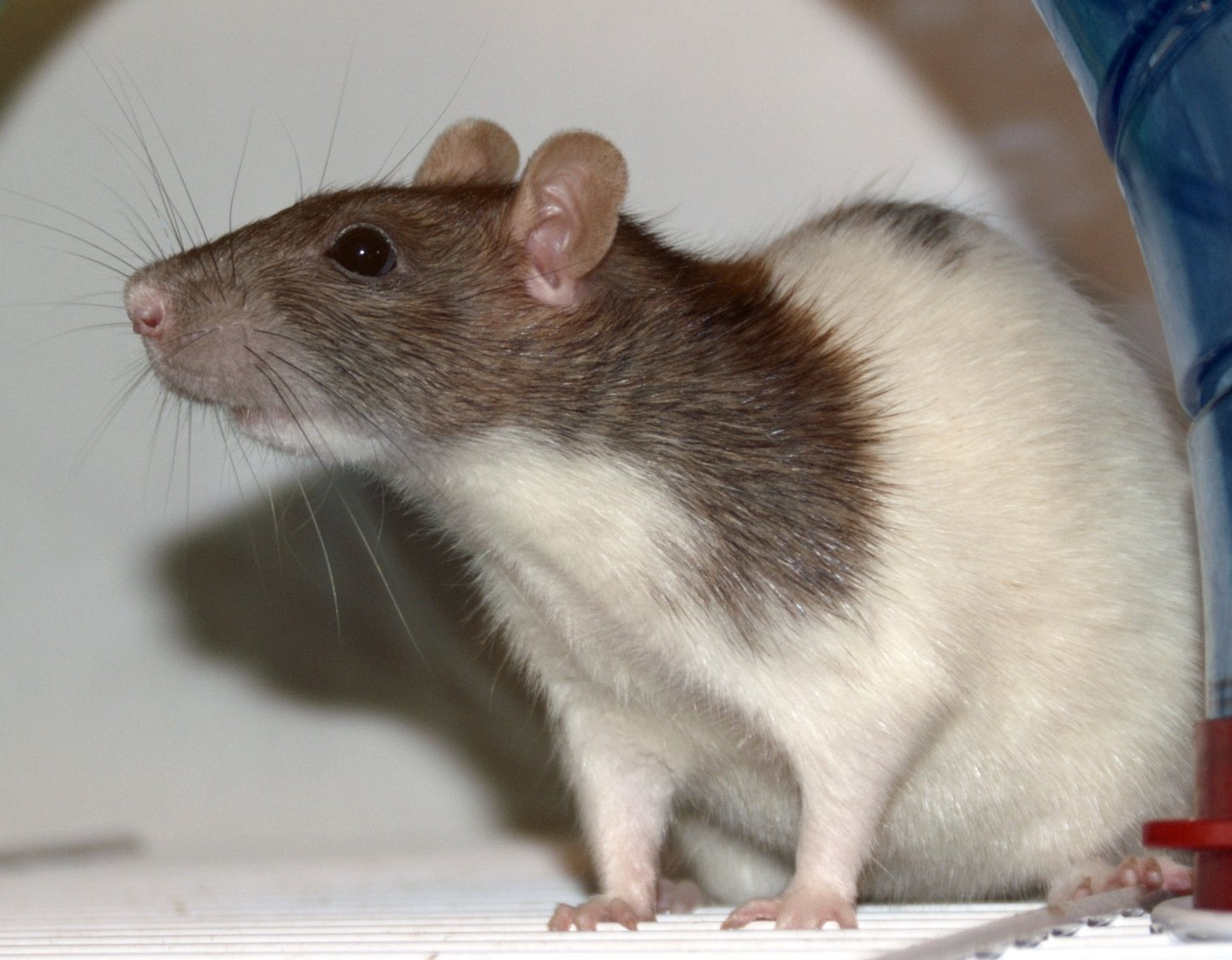
- A common hooded fancy rat
- Tax ID no.: 94-3400283
- Location: Clayton, California
- Website: www.rattieratz.org

Rattie Ratz: Rescue, Resource, and Referral is a nonprofit organization dedicated to the fancy rat (also known as the domestic rat or pet rat). It is based in Woodside, California. It was founded in 1998 and incorporated in 2001.

== History ==
Rattie Ratz was founded by college student Diane Weikal in the San Francisco Bay Area. Wanting a small pet for a small room, she went to the local Humane Society looking for a puppy and instead discovered the fancy rat. She soon found herself taking in rats in need, and Rattie Ratz began. Today Rattie Ratz is one of the largest rescue organizations dedicated specifically to rats. It has a network of foster homes which care for the rats until a permanent owner (also known as a "forever home") can be found. As a non-profit organization, Rattie Ratz depends on individual donations and voluntary foster homes to care for rats in transition.

== Mission ==
Rattie Ratz states their mission is "to improve the lives of domestic pet rats and their guardians by promoting value and respect for all animal life." They strive to educate the public and to place pet rats into loving homes. The organization is "dedicated to the rescue, rehabilitation and placement of domestic pet rats in Northern California."

== Function ==
Rattie Ratz works by taking in surrendered or seized pet rats from shelters such as Humane Society facilities. In some cases, Rattie Ratz will accept private surrenders. One major way Rattie Ratz helps in animal rescues is during hoarding cases, when numerous animals being kept in inhumane conditions are seized by authorities. After such a seizure, a humane organization or county shelter can find itself dealing with 1,000 rats from one home. Rescue groups like Rattie Ratz then step in and take in as many rats as they can handle and work to find homes.

The rat is an animal with a bad reputation. Wild rats do not make good pets, but the fancy rat has been bred for that specific purpose for many years. Rattie Ratz works to educate the public through events like The Wonderful World of Rats. Education of the public includes pet rat care, health, and behavior.

== See also ==
- National Fancy Rat Society
