= The Childhood of Jack Harkaway =

1910 film

The Childhood Of Jack Harkaway
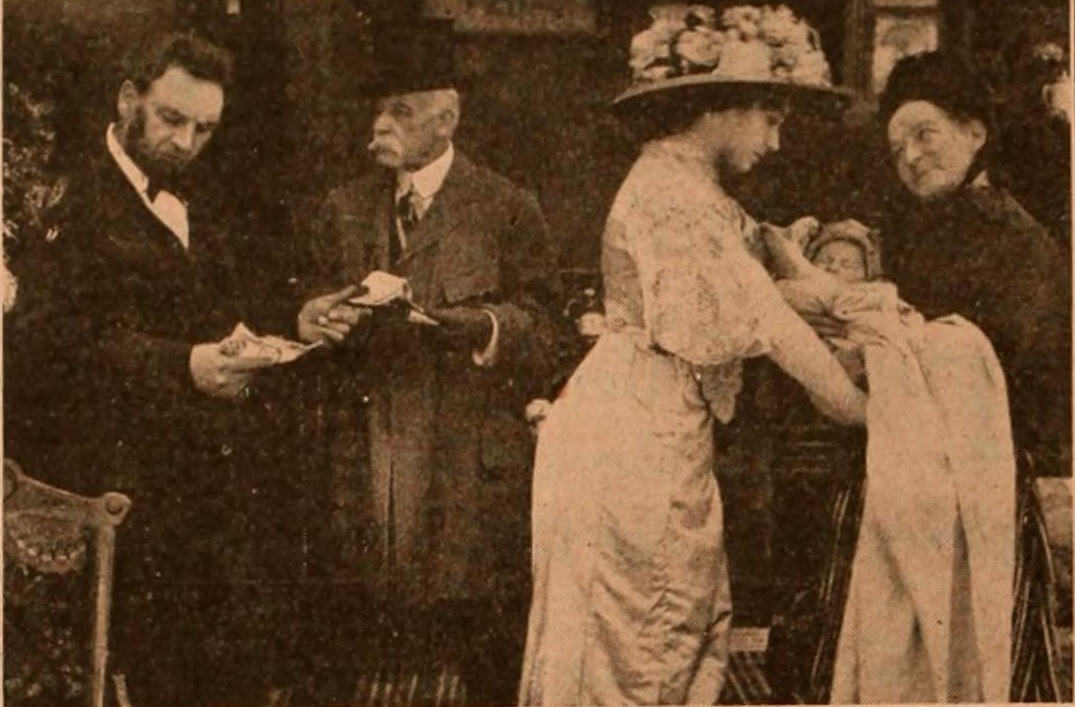
- A film still from the Thanhouser advertisement
- Written by: Lloyd Lonergan
- Produced by: Thanhouser Company
- Distributed by: Motion Picture Distributing and Sales Company
- Release date: December 23, 1910
- Country: United States
- Languages: Silent film English inter-titles

The Childhood Of Jack Harkaway is a 1910 American silent short drama produced by the Thanhouser Company. Adapted from Bracebridge Hemyng's Jack Harkaway story series by Lloyd Lonergan, the film depicts the life of the title character. Given to the care of strangers after his birth, Jack grows up and is sent to a school at age 12. After being severely and unjustly punished by the schoolmaster, Jack runs away and comes across two thieves plotting a robbery. Jack hurries to the house and warns the mistress of the planned robbery. The robbery is foiled and the lady of the house is very grateful, but Jack's schoolmaster and his guardian arrive to take him back. She recognizes the guardian as the man who forced her to turn over Jack and turns them out of the house. The film's cast and production credits are unknown. The film was released on December 23, 1910, it was met with favorable reviews and saw a wide national release. In 1988, a severely deteriorated nitrate print of the film was known to exist and it was likely transferred to the Library of Congress archives in 1997.

== Plot ==
The film is not lost, but a modern synopsis has not been published. The official synopsis of the film was published in The Moving Picture World on December 24, 1910. It states: "Jack Harkaway is of aristocratic birth, being the son of a wealthy Englishman's daughter and a poor young man, with whom she has eloped. Her parents bring about a separation and compel her to place the child in the hands of strangers, who are bribed to keep his whereabouts a secret from his mother. At the age of 12 Jack is placed in a school, the master of which is prejudiced against him, owing to the boy's mischievous disposition. After having received severe and unjust punishment from the schoolmaster, Jack decides to run away from school, and escapes from the room in which he is locked, through the window. Wandering along a country road, he accidentally overhears two sneak thieves planning to rob a house. Jack makes his way to the house in time to warn its mistress of the proposed robbery. Two [man] servants are placed in hiding, when the would-be thieves put in an appearance there and are immediately captured. Jack is given a fine supper by the lady of the house, who is very grateful to him. And when the schoolmaster, accompanied by Jack's guardian, arrives, she is touched by the boy's appeal not to be turned over to his rough-looking 'friends.' Upon getting a closer view of the man who calls himself the lad's guardian, she realizes that he is the man to whom she was forced to give over her child. The man admits that Jack is her own boy, and the picture ends with the men being turned out of the house and Jack restored to his mother's arms."

== Production ==
Lloyd Lonergan wrote the scenario based on Bracebridge Hemyng's Jack Harkaway story series. Film historian Q. David Bowers states that it was based on a stage play based upon a series of boys' stories, but does not cite a specific credit for which adaptation or work it was based on. Lonergan was an experienced newspaperman employed by The New York Evening World while writing scripts for the Thanhouser productions. The film director is unknown, but it may have been Barry O'Neil or Lucius J. Henderson. Cameramen employed by the company during this era included Blair Smith, Carl Louis Gregory, and Alfred H. Moses, Jr. though none are specifically credited. The role of the cameraman was uncredited in 1910 productions. The cast credits are unknown, but many 1910 Thanhouser productions are fragmentary. In late 1910, the Thanhouser company released a list of the important personalities in their films. The list includes G.W. Abbe, Justus D. Barnes, Frank H. Crane, Irene Crane, Marie Eline, Violet Heming, Martin J. Faust, Thomas Fortune, George Middleton, Grace Moore, John W. Noble, Anna Rosemond, Mrs. George Walters.

== Release and reception ==
The single reel drama, approximately 1,000 feet long, was released on December 23, 1910. The film had a wide national release, theaters which showed the film are noted in Indiana, Oklahoma, South Dakota, Missouri, Pennsylvania, and Arizona. Reviews of the film were mixed, with The Moving Picture World describing the film as a "heart story which will interest because it presents more or less unpleasant possibilities of this character. The acting is well done, and the film will prove popular with most audiences." The New York Dramatic Mirror reviewer found the film to be interesting, but stated that it "would have seemed more natural had [Jack Harkaway's mother] not recognized [Jack] as her son until the appearance of [his foster father], into whose care she had given her child. If two of the scenes had been broken it might have been more consistent. The men came up to plot their robbery too soon after Jack's hiding. They also appeared in the house immediately after the plan laid to capture them. They surely would have seen the light and would not have ventured so soon."

A surviving, but very deteriorated 35 mm nitrate print of the film was known to exist in 1988. It was described as being in various states of decomposition throughout the entire reel, including severe shrinkage and brittle or torn perforations. This print is 925 feet long and was held by John E. Allen, Inc. though it is not specifically known if it transferred to the Library of Congress in 1997.

== See also ==
- List of American films of 1910
