= Rat variety =

Rat variety may refer to:

- Fancy rat varieties of R. norvegicus domestica kept as pets
- Stocks and strains of laboratory rats used in science
- Species of rat in a number of families of rodents
- Pet rat species domesticated by humans

== See also ==
- Rat (disambiguation)
- Mouse variety (disambiguation)
