= Jack Black (rat catcher) =

Nineteenth-century British rat catcher

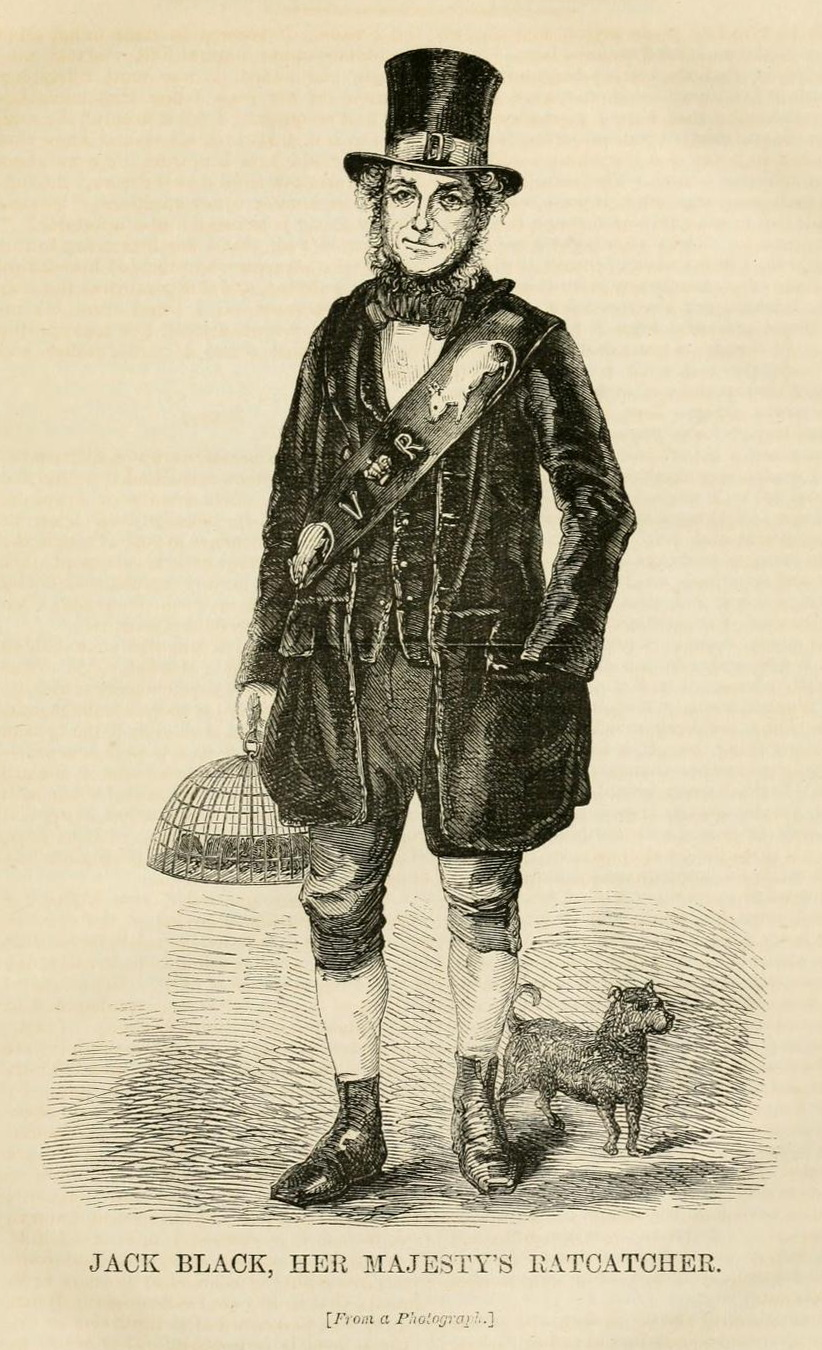
Jack Black, woodcut print from London Labour and the London Poor (Vol. 3), 1851

Jack Black was a rat-catcher and mole destroyer from Battersea, England during the middle of the 19th century. At the time, England was ravaged by a massive population of rats that disrupted crops and spread disease, and Black's rat killing abilities made him a minor celebrity and he advertised himself as Queen Victoria's official rat-catcher. Though he has been called the rat's "most notorious enemy", he did not kill all rats. Black bred unusually coloured rats and sold them as pets, playing a large role in domesticating the animal. He had a flamboyant appearance, typically donning a self-made "uniform" of green overcoat, scarlet waistcoat, and leather sash adorned with metal rats.

== Biography ==
As a young boy, Jack Black grabbed wild rats in Regent's Park and flung them in wire cages, which impressed passersby. He behaved like a showman, entertaining onlookers by training rats to live in his shirt and crawl up and down his arms. Black said the rat work came naturally to him. He earned himself various jobs catching rats on private property, and he also supplied live rats to pubs for rat-baiting contests, a popular mid-Victorian activity of placing bets on the number of rats a dog could kill. Black's promotional flyers described him as "V.R. Rat and mole destroyer to Her Majesty".

Jack Black's eye-catching outfit caught the attention of Henry Mayhew, who wrote about Black in London Labour and the London Poor. Black told Mayhew about his vicious, nearly-fatal battles against England's rats: "I’ve been bitten nearly everywhere, even where I can’t name to you," he said. He also revealed that he tasted rat flesh "unbeknown to his wife," describing it as "moist as rabbits, and quite as nice."

Black's signature tactic was to train ferrets to sniff out rats and then unleash dogs on the rats. He experimented with various other animals including raccoons, a badger named Polly, and a monkey which he said "didn’t do much". In addition to rat-killing, Black was involved in fishing, bird catching, taxidermy, and was particularly accomplished in dog breeding. He told Mayhew that his black tan terrier Billy, a rat-killing dog, was "the greatest stock dog in London" and had fathered "the greatest portion of the small black tan dogs" in the city, making the dog "known to all the London fancy". He said he sold a similar dog to the Austrian Ambassador for fourteen pounds.

When Jack Black caught unusually coloured rats, he bred them to establish new colour varieties. He decorated his home-bred domesticated rats with ribbons and sold them as pets, mainly "to well-bred young ladies to keep in squirrel cages", he said. Beatrix Potter is believed to have been one of his customers, and she dedicated the book Samuel Whiskers to her rat of the same name. The more sophisticated ladies of court kept their rats in dainty gilded cages, and even Queen Victoria herself kept rats. It was in this way that domesticated or fancy rats were established.

== Establishment of fancy rats ==
Jack Black's sales of rats as pets during the 1840s and 1860s played a role in the rat's domestication and widespread acceptance as a pet. He bred many different colours of the rats, which became known as fancy rats. By 1869, Charles Baudelaire called the rat "the poor child’s toy" in his poetry collection Le Spleen de Paris. By 1901, rats were so popular as pets that Mary Douglas received permission from England's National Mouse Club to bring her pet rats to an exhibition at the Aylesbury Town Show on 24 October 1901. Her black and white hooded Rattus norvegicus won "Best in Show," and the Rat Fancy was formally launched.

The original Rat Fancy lasted until 1931, as part of the National Mouse and Rat Club. The modern Rat Fancy was revived in 1976 with the formation of the National Fancy Rat Society, and the fancy rat spread around the world. Nowadays, fancy rats are widely accepted as pets and exhibition animals.

== See also ==
- Rat-baiting
