= London Labour and the London Poor =

4-volume study by Henry Mayhew, 1840s

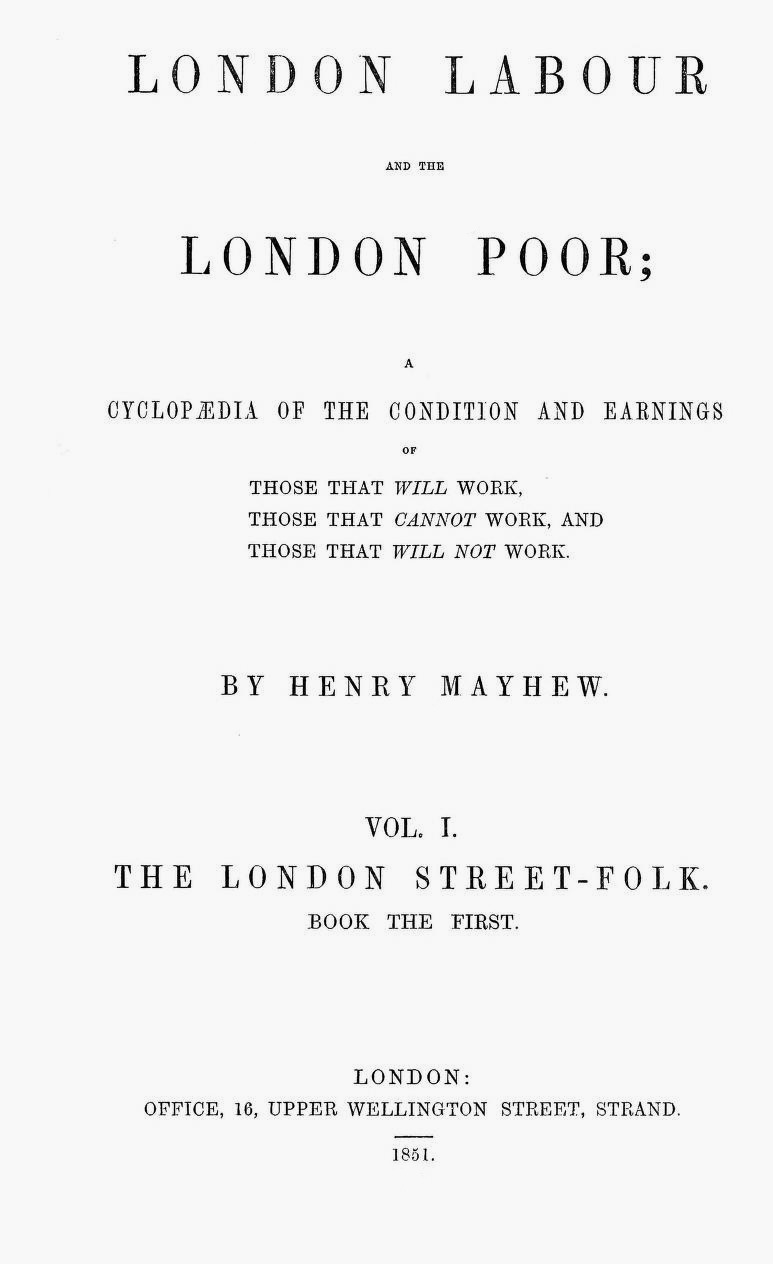
- Title page of vol. I, 1851
- Author: Henry Mayhew
- Language: English
- Genre: sociological survey
- Publisher: George Woodfall and Son (Vol. I); Griffin, Bohn, and Company (II–IV)
- Publication date: 1840s (in serial form); 1851 (Vol. I), 1861 (II, III), 1862 (IV)
- Publication place: United Kingdom

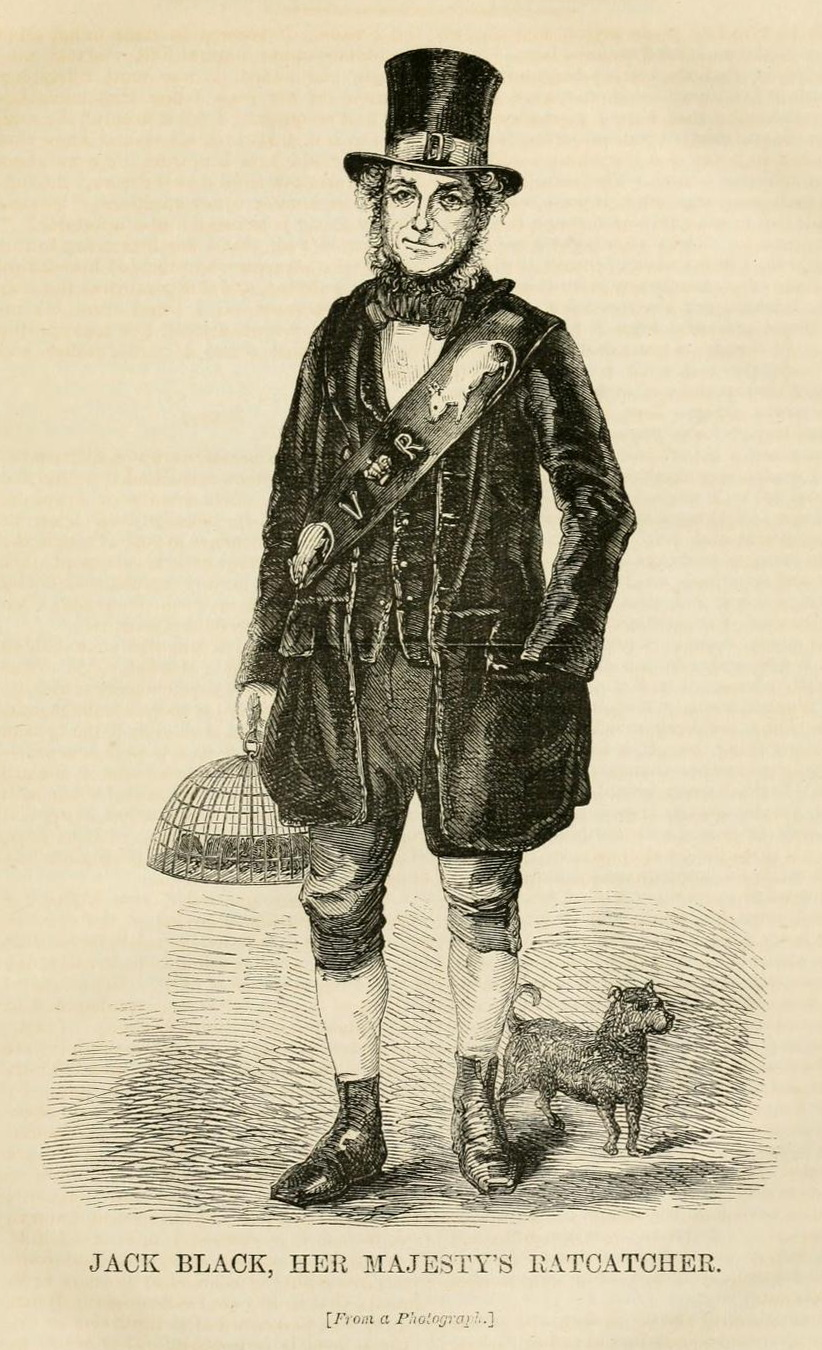
"Jack Black, Her Majesty's ratcatcher", from volume 3, p. 11 (1861)

London Labour and the London Poor is a work of Victorian journalism by Henry Mayhew. In the 1840s, he observed, documented and described the state of working people in London for a series of articles in a newspaper, the Morning Chronicle, which were later compiled into book form. Mayhew was accompanied on his walks of impoverished neighbourhoods by his friend, the author Charles Dickens.

Mayhew went into deep, almost forensic detail concerning the trades, habits, religion and domestic arrangements of the thousands of people working in London. Much of the material includes detailed interviews in which people candidly describe their lives and work. For instance, Jack Black talks about his job as "rat and mole destroyer to Her Majesty" and remains in good humour despite his experience of a succession of near-fatal infections from bites.

Beyond that anecdotal material, Mayhew's articles are particularly notable for attempting to justify numerical estimates with other information, such as census data and police statistics. Thus, if the assertion is made that 8,000 of a particular type of trader operate in the streets, Mayhew compares that to the total number of miles of street in the city, with an estimate of how many traders operate per mile.

The articles were collected and published in three volumes between 1851 and 1861. A fourth "Extra Volume", published in 1862, was co-written with Bracebridge Hemyng, John Binny and Andrew Halliday and covered the lives of streetwalkers, thieves and beggars, but it departed from the interview format to take a more general and statistical approach to its subject.

== Mayhew's London ==
London in the 1840s was more like a 21st-century Third World megalopolis than a typical 19th-century city. A significant portion of the population had no fixed place of work, and indeed, many had no fixed abode. In classic fashion, the city teemed with outsiders and citizens who had moved to London from other parts of Britain; meanwhile, the British Empire's continued growth meant that people from across the world had also arrived to seek their fortune.

While goods were sold from storefronts, food, drink, textiles and household goods were distributed by thousands of street sellers from baskets, carts and wagons. Alongside these relatively familiar forms of trade in consumer goods and services, Mayhew's work describes lesser-known trades driven by now-obsolete markets and by sheer poverty, such as gathering of snails for food, and the extreme forms of recycling practised by pure finders (who collected dog dung for tanneries), the scavenging of the mudlarks (who spent their days combing the shores of the Thames for valuables hidden in the sand and silt) and 'toshers' (who searched the sewers for scrap metal and other valuables).

Mayhew's perception as an observer is unsurpassed in early descriptions of London's street scenes. His richly detailed descriptions are able to give an impression of what the street markets of his day were like. The following is a typical such description, presented very early in the first volume of the work:

The pavement and the road are crowded with purchasers and street-sellers. The housewife in her thick shawl, with the market-basket on her arm, walks slowly on, stopping now to look at the stall of caps, and now to cheapen a bunch of greens. Little boys, holding three or four onions in their hand, creep between the people, wriggling their way through every interstice, and asking for custom in whining tones, as if seeking charity. Then the tumult of the thousand different cries of the eager dealers, all shouting at the top of their voices, at one and the same time, is almost bewildering. "So-old again," roars one. "Chestnuts all'ot, a penny a score," bawls another. "An 'aypenny a skin, blacking," squeaks a boy. "Buy, buy, buy, buy, buy-- bu-u-uy!" cries the butcher. "Half-quire of paper for a penny," bellows the street stationer. "An 'aypenny a lot ing-uns." "Twopence a pound grapes." "Three a penny Yarmouth bloaters." "Who'll buy a bonnet for fourpence?" "Pick 'em out cheap here! three pair for a halfpenny, bootlaces." "Now's your time! beautiful whelks, a penny a lot." "Here's ha'p'orths," shouts the perambulating confectioner. "Come and look at 'em! here's toasters!" bellows one with a Yarmouth bloater stuck on a toasting fork. "Penny a lot, fine russets," calls the apple woman: and so the Babel goes on.

== Composition ==
The articles comprising London Labour and the London Poor were initially collected into three volumes between 1851 and 1861. A fourth volume, co-written with Bracebridge Hemyng, John Binny and Andrew Halliday, was released in 1862. It covered the lives of prostitutes, thieves and beggars. This extra volume took a more general and statistical approach to its subject than the earlier works.

He wrote in volume one: "I shall consider the whole of the metropolitan poor under three separate phases, according as they will work, they can't work, and they won't work."

Mayhew interviewed everyone — beggars, street-entertainers (such as Punch and Judy men), market traders, prostitutes, labourers, sweatshop workers, even down to the "mudlarks" who searched the stinking mud on the banks of the River Thames for wood, metal, rope and coal from passing ships, and the "pure-finders" who gathered dog faeces to sell to tanners. He described their clothes, how and where they lived, their entertainments and customs, and made detailed estimates of the numbers and incomes of those practicing each trade. The book describes how marginal and precarious many people's lives were, in what was at that time perhaps the richest city in the world.

== Use in culture ==
Poet Philip Larkin used an extract from London Labour and the London Poor as the epigraph for his poem "Deceptions". The extract details a rape: "Of course I was drugged, and so heavily I did not regain consciousness until the next morning. I was horrified to discover that I had been ruined, and for some days I was inconsolable, and cried like a child to be killed or sent back to my aunt."

Writer Ben Gwalchmai was inspired to write his satirical novel Purefinder after reading about pure finders in the works of Dickens and Mayhew. London Labour and the London Poor was also a regular reference in the creation of the novel.

Terry Pratchett's novel Dodger draws heavily from Mayhew's work.

Michele Robert's novel The Walworth Beauty presents a fictional account of the composition of London Labour and the London Poor.

In the annotations to Alan Moore's graphic novel From Hell, Moore cites London Labour and the London Poor as a source for the book's depictions of working-class Victorian life.

== The Big City or the New Mayhew ==
In the early 1950s, Punch published a series of articles based upon and to some extent parodying London Labour and the London Poor. Although these articles were humorous, their purpose was still to document and describe the lives of working people in London. In 1953, the articles, which were written by Alex Atkinson and illustrated by Ronald Searle, were published in a single volume under the title The Big City or the New Mayhew.

== See also ==
- Street Life in London, 1877 book

== Editions and selections ==
- Henry Mayhew. London Labour and the London Poor; a cyclopaedia of the condition and earnings of those that will work, those that cannot work, and those that will not work. (Illustrated with woodcut prints, in part from daguerreotypes by Richard Beard). OCLC 472470624.
  - Vol. 1. The London Street-Folk. Book the First. London: George Woodfall and Son. 1851.
  - Vol. 2. The London Street-Folk; comprising, Street sellers. Street buyers. Street finders. Street performers. Street artizans. Street labourers. With Numerous Illustrations from Photographs. London: Griffin, Bohn, and Company. 1861.
  - Vol. 3. The London Street-Folk; comprising, Street sellers. Street buyers. Street finders. Street performers. Street artizans. Street labourers. With Numerous Illustrations from Photographs. London: Griffin, Bohn, and Company. 1861.
  - (Vol. 4.) Those that will not work. Comprising, Prostitutes. Thieves. Swindlers. Beggars. By Several Contributors. With Introductory Essay on the Agencies at Present in Operation in the Metropolis for the Supression of Vice and Crime. By the Rev. William Tuckniss, B.A., [...]. With Illustrations. Co-written by Bracebridge Hemyng, John Binny and Andrew Halliday. London: Griffin, Bohn, and Company. 1862.
- Henry Mayhew. London Labour and the London Poor. In Four Volumes Complete and Unabridged. Dover Publications, London 1968.
- E. P. Thompson, Eileen Yeo (eds.).The Unknown Mayhew, Selections from the "Morning Chronicle" 1849-50. The Merlin Press, 1971.
  - Reprint: Pelican Classics, London 1973.
- Henry Mayhew. London Labour and the London Poor; selections made and introduced by Victor Neuburg, Penguin Classics, London 1985, ISBN 0-14-043241-8.
