= American Fancy Rat and Mouse Association =

Club for rodent enthusiasts

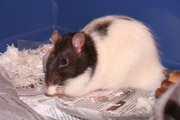
The AFRMA has specific standards for the coloring, texture, and patterns of rat fur.

The American Fancy Rat and Mouse Association (AFRMA), formed in 1983, is a California-based club of rodent enthusiasts that organizes shows, establishes breed standards, and promotes both the fancy rat and the fancy mouse as appealing pets. Their scope and intent is similar to the American Kennel Club in its association with dogs.

The AFRMA's self described purpose is to "promote and encourage the breeding and exhibition of fancy rats and mice for show and pets." The club prefers not to take any official stance on the ethics of culling, reptile feeding, or animal rights. Instead, it accepts the individuality of its members and their interests.

American Fancy Rat and Mouse Association has an Annual Show in California every year.
