= Biobreeding rat =

Laboratory rat strain

Biobreeding rat, also known as the BB or BBDP rat, is an inbred laboratory rat strain that spontaneously develops autoimmune Type 1 Diabetes. Like the NOD mice, BB rats are used as an animal model for Type 1 diabetes. The strain re-capitulates many of the features of human type 1 diabetes, and has contributed greatly to the research of T1D pathogenesis.

Two T1D susceptibility genes have been identified in the BB rat. The susceptible MHC class II RT1u haplotype on chromosome 20 and a null mutation in the GIMAP5 gene on chromosome 4. The Gimap5 mutation results in severe T cell lymphopenia in the BB rat and is thought to contribute to T1D pathogenesis through impaired development and function and regulatory T cells. Recently, 8 additional loci on rat chromosomes 1,2,3,6 (2 loci), 12 and 14 have been shown to be linked to Type 1 Diabetes in the BB rat.

== History ==
BB rats are the most extensively studied rat model of T1D. They were originally derived from a Canadian colony of outbred Wistar rats that spontaneously develop hyperglycemia and ketoacidosis, characteristic of clinical onset of T1D. Subsequent BB rat colonies were established. One in Worcester, Massachusetts, has been inbred and known as BBDP/Wor and another one in Ottawa, Canada, an outbred strain known as BBdp.

== Modulation of diabetes ==
Diabetes in BB rats can be prevented by a single injection of mycobacterial adjuvants such as complete Freund's adjuvant (FCA).

== See also ==
- NOD mice
- Type 1 Diabetes
- Autoimmunity
