= NOD mice =

Strain of mice genetically prone to developing diabetes

Non-obese diabetic or NOD mice, like biobreeding rats, are used as an animal model for type 1 diabetes. Diabetes develops in NOD mice as a result of insulitis, a leukocytic infiltrate of the pancreatic islets. The onset of diabetes is associated with a moderate glycosuria and a non-fasting hyperglycemia. It is recommended to monitor for development of glycosuria from 10 weeks of age; this can be carried out using urine glucose dipsticks. NOD mice will develop spontaneous diabetes when left in a sterile environment. The incidence of spontaneous diabetes in the NOD mouse is 60–80% in females and 20–30% in males. Onset of diabetes also varies between males and females: commonly, onset is delayed in males by several weeks. The mice (as well as C57BL/6 and SJL) are known to carry IgG2c allele.

== History ==
Non-obese diabetic (NOD) mice exhibit a susceptibility to spontaneous development of autoimmune insulin dependent diabetes mellitus (IDDM). The NOD strain and related strains were developed at Shionogi Research Laboratories in Aburahi, Japan by Makino and colleagues and first reported in 1980. The group developed the NOD strain by an outbreeding of the cataract-prone strain from JcI:ICR mice.

== Susceptibility ==
The susceptibility to IDDM is polygenic and environment exerts a strong effect on gene penetrances. Environment including housing conditions, health status, and diet all affect development of diabetes in the mice. For instance, NOD mice maintained in different laboratories can have different levels of incidence. The incidence of disease is linked to the microbiome.

NOD mice are also susceptible to developing other autoimmune syndromes, including autoimmunine sialitis, autoimmune thyroiditis, autoimmune peripheral polyneuropathy etc. Diabetes in these mice can be prevented by a single injection of mycobacterial adjuvants such as complete Freund's adjuvant (FCA) or Bacille de Calmette et Guérin (BCG) vaccine.

== Identifying IDDM susceptibility loci ==
Genetic Loci associated with susceptibility to IDDM have been identified in the NOD mouse strain through the development of congenic mouse strains, which have identified several insulin dependent diabetes (Idd) loci. The most important is idd1 which is the major histocompatibility complex class II loci I-Ag7.

NOD mice have polymorphisms in the Idd3 locus which are linked to IL-2 production. IL-2 promotes either immunity or tolerance in a concentration dependent fashion by acting on T helper cells, CTL and NK cells. Low amounts of IL-2 may be needed to promote survival of Treg in mice. Loss of IL-2 can thereby contribute to the development of autoimmunity in NOD mice.

NOD mice have a mutation in exon 2 of the CTLA-4 gene, which causes it to be spliced incorrectly. CTLA-4 plays a major role in suppressing the T-cell immune response. Without the proper functioning of CTLA-4, T-cells attack the insulin producing cells. This results in Type 1 Diabetes.
