= Susan Weiss =

American microbiologist

Susan R. Weiss
- Education: Brandeis University (BA); Harvard University (PhD)
- Known for: Coronavirus
- Scientific career
- Workplaces: Perelman School of Medicine at the University of Pennsylvania; University of California, San Francisco
- Thesis: Analysis of Newcastle disease virus messenger RNA and poly (A) (1976)

External audio
- "Pandemic Perspectives: Interview with Susan Weiss", May 21, 2020, Science History Institute.

Susan R. Weiss is an American microbiologist who is a Professor of Microbiology at the Perelman School of Medicine at the University of Pennsylvania. She holds vice chair positions for the Department of Microbiology and for Faculty Development. Her research considers the biology of coronaviruses, including SARS, MERS and SARS-CoV-2. As of March 2020, Weiss serves as Co-Director of the University of Pennsylvania/Penn Medicine Center for Research on Coronavirus and Other Emerging Pathogens.

== Early life and education ==
Weiss attended Roosevelt High School. She eventually studied biology at Brandeis University and graduated in 1971 with her B.A. She moved to Harvard University for her doctoral research, where she studied Virulent Newcastle disease. Weiss started studying coronaviruses during her postdoctoral research at the University of California, San Francisco. At the time, very little was known about the impact of coronaviruses, other than that they can cause the common cold in humans.

== Research and career ==
Weiss' coronavirus research has encompassed the emerging pathogens severe acute respiratory syndrome (SARS), Middle East respiratory syndrome (MERS), Human coronavirus OC43, Human coronavirus 229E and the coronavirus disease. These coronaviruses have all evolved to shut down immune responses but have different accessory proteins. Coronaviruses are complex viruses that circulate in animals and occasionally infect humans. They have the largest RNA genome of any viruses, which indicates that they have a wide array of proteins that can attack host cells. Whilst MERS has a viral reservoir in camels and may be transmitted to humans via camel handlers, SARS does not have such a specific reservoir. Coronaviruses that occur in humans are primarily viruses of the respiratory tract.

Weiss began to work on coronaviruses in the 1980s, when the field was relatively new. She makes use of the murine coronavirus (known as mouse hepatitis virus or MHV) to develop mouse models that allow the study of various pathologies, including viral encephalitis and demyelinating disease. She uses a reverse genetic system to better manipulate the viral genome. Reverse genetics helps to understand the function of a gene through the analysis of phenotypic effects of nucleic acid sequences. She looks to understand what determines coronavirus viral and cellular tropism, as well as better understanding the pathogenesis of coronavirus in the brain. This has involved studies of the interferon antagonists that are encoded by the coronavirus, specifically phosphodiesterase, which antagonizes OAS-RNase L (Ribonuclease L) immune pathway. Weiss has considered the mechanisms by which the phosphodiesterase antagonizes Ribonuclease L. She has studied the role of inflammasome-related cytokines in mouse hepatitis virus-induced disease. Despite murine coronavirus being a useful model of coronaviruses, it is still unclear how mouse hepatitis virus is spread. There is only one receptor for the mouse hepatitis virus – the carcinoembryonic antigen – but highly virulent strains of the virus can spread even when this receptor is not present.

In 2020, Weiss was made Co-Director of the University of Pennsylvania Center of Research for Coronaviruses and Other Emerging Pathogens. The Center looks to accelerate research that focuses on SARS-CoV-2, become a centralized repository of SARS-CoV-2 research and create new opportunities to fund research relating to SARS-CoV-2. SARS-CoV-2 is different to SARS; as there are many people who have mild or asymptomatic coronavirus disease without being aware that they have it. Whereas in the case of SARS, patients were too unwell to leave their homes, so they tended to self-isolate, and the virus was most transmissible from severely ill patients rather than asymptomatic ones. In March 2020, Weiss was awarded certification from the Centers for Disease Control and Prevention (CDC) to work with the SARS-CoV-2 virus in a BSL 3 laboratory at the University of Pennsylvania. As well as investigating potential antivirals, the Weiss laboratory are studying the evolution of SARS-CoV-2. Work during the SARS-CoV-2/COVID-19 pandemic includes identification of SARS-CoV-2 in domestic cats, the innate immune response to SARS-CoV-2 infection, and critical reviews of scientific evidence for the origin of SARS-CoV-2.

Weiss' work and expertise has been featured in the science podcast This Week in Virology in both 2020 and 2021. As of 2024, she is a fellow and a current governor of the American Academy of Microbiology, a fellow of the American Association for the Advancement of Science, and in 2023 was elected to the National Academy of Sciences.

== Selected publications ==
- Ku Z, Xie X, Davidson E, Ye X, Su H, Menachery VD, Li Y, Yuan Z, Zhang X, Muruato AE, I Escuer AG, Tyrell B, Doolan K, Doranz BJ, Wrapp D, Bates PF, McLellan JS, Weiss SR, Zhang N, Shi PY, An Z. Molecular determinants and mechanism for antibody cocktail preventing SARS-CoV-2 escape. Nat Commun. 2021 Jan 20;12(1):469. doi: 10.1038/s41467-020-20789-7.
- Weiss, S. R.; Navas-Martin, S. (2005-12-01). "Coronavirus Pathogenesis and the Emerging Pathogen Severe Acute Respiratory Syndrome Coronavirus". Microbiology and Molecular Biology Reviews. 69 (4): 635–664. doi:10.1128/mmbr.69.4.635-664.2005. ISSN 1092-2172. PMC 1306801. PMID 16339739.
- Yount, B.; Denison, M. R.; Weiss, S. R.; Baric, R. S. (2002-11-01). "Systematic Assembly of a Full-Length Infectious cDNA of Mouse Hepatitis Virus Strain A59". Journal of Virology. 76 (21): 11065–11078. doi:10.1128/jvi.76.21.11065-11078.2002. ISSN 0022-538X. PMC 136593. PMID 12368349.
- de Haan, Cornelis A.M.; Masters, Paul S.; Shen, Xiaolan; Weiss, Susan; Rottier, Peter J.M. (2002-04-25). "The Group-Specific Murine Coronavirus Genes Are Not Essential, but Their Deletion, by Reverse Genetics, Is Attenuating in the Natural Host". Virology. 296 (1): 177–189. doi:10.1006/viro.2002.1412. ISSN 0042-6822. PMC 7133727. PMID 12036329.
