= Down Under rat =

Fancy rat variety

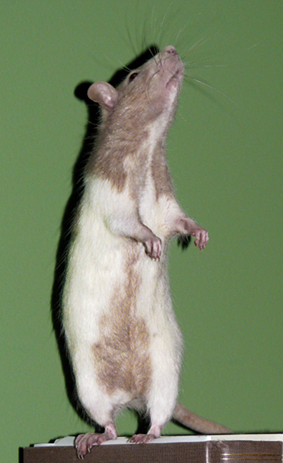
A beige-coloured Down Under rat.

The Down Under rat (Downunder or DU) is a fancy rat variety noted for the markings on its stomach. The "downunder" marking refers to both a patch of colour on the underside of the rat which matches the coat colouring on the top, and to the variety's Australian origins.

While most varieties either have a white pattern on their undersides, or they are completely one colour, the Down Under stands out for its coloured ventral markings against a white background. These markings may be symmetrical or asymmetrical shapes, stripes, or spots. Additionally, because other markings are traditionally found on other parts of the body, Downunders are able to be crossed with those markings to produce varieties like a DU blaze—a rat with a white stripe on its nose. The genes for creating a Downunder rat are dominant, needing only one parent to produce the marking.

Due to Australia's strict importation laws, rats are prohibited from being intentionally brought into the country. This has forced the rat fancy hobby to develop varieties in parallel to those found abroad. The Down Under is the first variety to originate in Australia. It was first noted in a litter of hairless rats bred by Cindy Cairns Sautchuk of 'The Rodent Ranch' in New South Wales. The first breeding Down Under was a furred male named Enigma. It is sometimes thought that the Down Under variety came from breeders in Brisbane, the bRatpack and RatmanDU ratteries. However, these breeders are actually just credited with shipping the first Downunders overseas.
