= Mouse variety =

Mouse variety may refer to:

- A fancy mouse variety, as kept as a pet
- A laboratory mouse strain or stock, as used in science
- A species in any mouse subgenus, as found in nature

== See also ==
- Mouse (disambiguation)
- Rat variety (disambiguation)
