= Rat coronavirus =

Virus classification
- (unranked): Virus
- Realm: Riboviria
- Kingdom: Orthornavirae
- Phylum: Pisuviricota
- Class: Pisoniviricetes
- Order: Nidovirales
- Family: Coronaviridae
- Genus: Betacoronavirus
- Subgenus: Embecovirus
- Species: Murine coronavirus
- Strain: Rat coronavirus

Strains
- Sialodacryoadenitis virus (SDAV); Parker's Rat Coronavirus (PRC); CARS; RCV-BCMM; RCV-W; RCV-NJ

Strain of virus

Rat coronavirus, or RCV, is a strain or subspecies of Murine coronavirus that infects rats. The earliest discovered strains of Rat coronavirus were Sialodacryoadenitis virus, also known as SDAV, and Parker's Rat Coronavirus (PRC). Four other substrains have since been discovered; CARS, RCV-BCMM, RCV-W and RCV-NJ.

== Virology ==
The viral particles of RCV are irregular to round and about 120 to 160 nm in size. They cannot be distinguished morphologically from other members of the genus Coronavirus.

== Genome ==
The rat coronavirus is a single-stranded RNA virus with positive polarity that is approximately 27 to 33 kb long.

== Substrains ==
Sialodacryoadenitis virus, or SDAV affects the upper respiratory tract and can be transmitted between individuals by direct contact and indirectly by aerosol. It causes the disease Sialodacryoadenitis, the primary symptom of which are tropism of the salivary, lachrymal and harderian glands. Most infections are mild, but acute infections have high morbidity. It is spread among laboratory animals as well as in pets.

Parker's rat coronavirus, or PRC and most other rat coronavirus strains cause respiratory illness. Both SDAV and PRC can cause lesions in the lungs.
