= Harderian gland =

Gland in the eye socket of some tetrapods

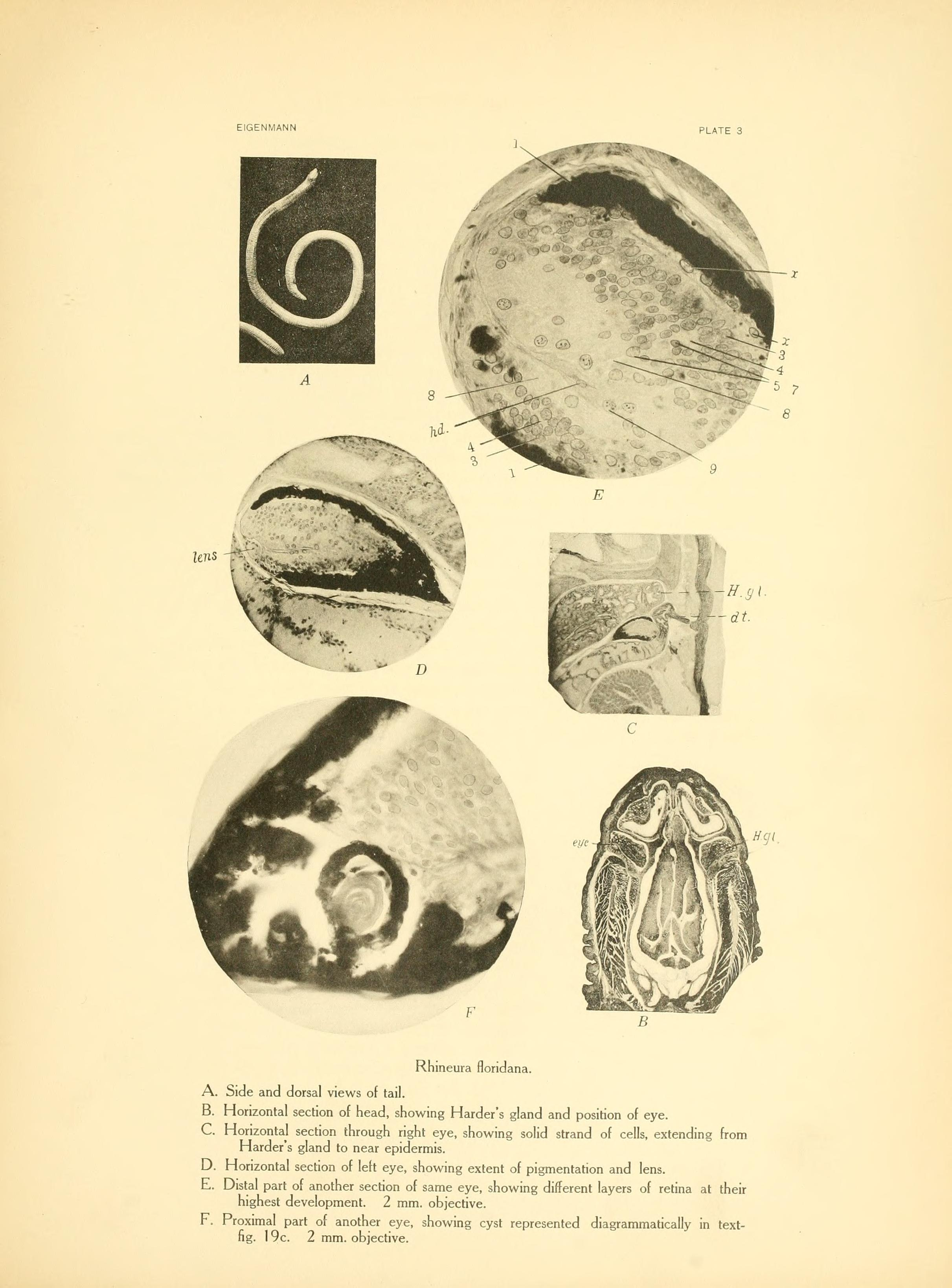
Rhineura floridana; the Harderian gland is marked H. gl. in diagram B (horizontal section of head) and C (horizontal section through right eye).

The Harderian gland is a gland found within the eyesocket of tetrapods (reptiles, amphibians, birds and mammals) that possess a nictitating membrane, or third eyelid.

The gland can be compound tubular or compound tubuloalveolar, and the fluid it secretes (mucous, serous or lipid) varies between different groups of animals. In some animals, it acts as an accessory to the lacrimal gland, secreting fluid that eases movement of the nictitating membrane. Research has proposed that the gland has several other functions, including that of a photoprotective organ, a location of immune response, a source of thermoregulatory lipids, a source of pheromones, and a site of osmoregulation. In mammals, the gland secretes an oily substance used to preen the fur. The presence or absence of this gland is one of the cues used by palaeontologists to determine when fur evolved in the ancestors of mammals.

The Harderian gland was first described in 1694 by Swiss anatomist Johann Jacob Harder (1656–1711). He documented his findings in a paper titled Glandula nova lachrymalis una cum ductu excretorio in cervis et damis, ("A new lachrymal gland with an excretory duct in red and fallow deer", English translation).
