= Ringtail (disease) =

Rodent disease

Ringtail, also known as tail necrosis, is an epidermal disease that may occur in rats, mice, hamsters and other rodents.

In affected individuals, the tail swells as a consequence of annular constrictions along its length (hence the name "ringtail") and subsequent dehydration; in the most severe cases, the process may end up in the tail becoming gangrenous and dropping off. Feet may also swell and redden.

Ringtail is traditionally attributed to low environmental humidity and high temperature, although a number of other possible causes have been suggested, from dietary deficiencies (low levels of fatty acids) to genetic predisposition. For lab and pet rodents, poor bedding (i.e., overly absorbent bedding) or repeated blood draws from tail veins have also been identified as possible causes of ringtail.
