= GIMAP5 =

Type of enzyme

Identifiers
- Aliases: GIMAP5, HIMAP3, IAN-5, IAN4, IAN4L1, IAN5, IMAP3, IROD, GTPase, IMAP family member 5, NCPH2
- External IDs: OMIM: 608086; MGI: 1932723; GeneCards: GIMAP5

Gene location (Human)
Chr.	Chromosome 7 (human)
Band	7q36.1	Start	150,722,253 bp
Band	7q36.1	End	150,750,033 bp

Gene location (Mouse)
Chr.	Chromosome 6 (mouse)
Band	6|6 B2.3	Start	48,741,398 bp
Band	6|6 B2.3	End	48,747,785 bp
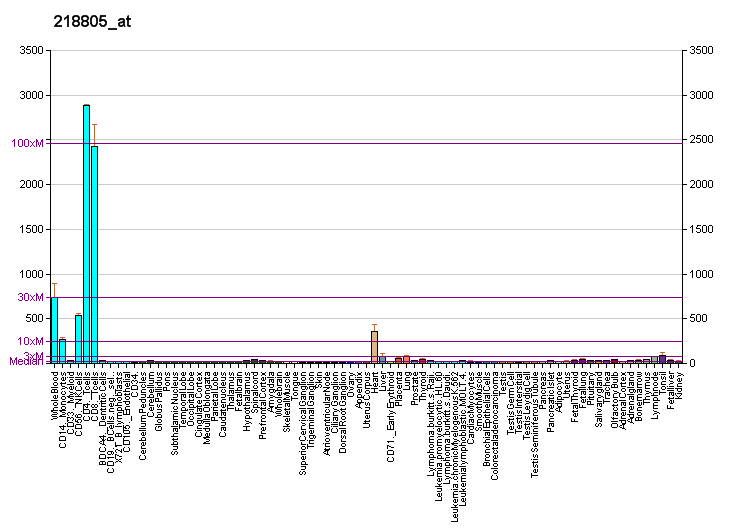

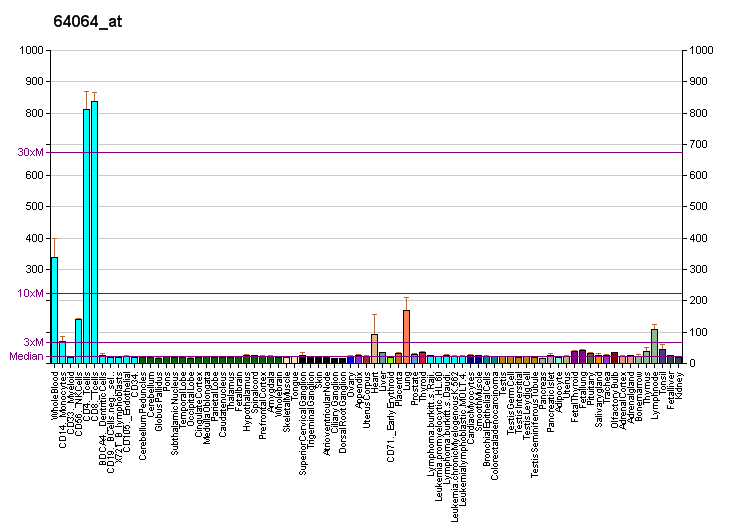
RNA expression pattern
Bgee	Human / Mouse (ortholog); Top expressed in: right lung; granulocyte; upper lobe of left lung; spleen; lymph node; apex of heart; right lobe of thyroid gland; left lobe of thyroid gland; Achilles tendon; gastric mucosa / Top expressed in: lymph node; mesenteric lymph nodes; spleen; blood; thymus; subcutaneous adipose tissue; duodenum; right lung; granulocyte; submandibular gland; More reference expression data
BioGPS	More reference expression data
Orthologs
Databases	NCBI: entry; OMA: entry
Species	Human	Mouse
Entrez	55340	83408
Ensembl	ENSG00000196329	ENSMUSG00000039264
UniProt	Q96F15	Q99MI6
RefSeq (mRNA)	NM_018384	NM_031247
RefSeq (protein)	NP_060854; NP_060854.2	NP_112537
Location (UCSC)	Chr 7: 150.72 – 150.75 Mb	Chr 6: 48.74 – 48.75 Mb
PubMed search
- Wikidata
View/Edit Human	View/Edit Mouse

GTPase IMAP family member 5 is an enzyme that in humans is encoded by the GIMAP5 gene.

This gene encodes a protein belonging to the GTP-binding superfamily and to the immuno-associated nucleotide (IAN) subfamily of nucleotide-binding proteins. In humans, the IAN subfamily genes are located in a cluster at 7q36.1.
