= Mites of domestic animals =

Type of parasite of domestic animals

Mites that infest and parasitize domestic animals cause disease and loss of production. Mites are small invertebrates, most of which are free living but some are parasitic. Mites are similar to ticks and both comprise the order Acari in the phylum Arthropoda. Mites are highly varied and their classification is complex; a simple grouping is used in this introductory article. Vernacular terms to describe diseases caused by mites include scab, mange, and scabies. Mites and ticks have substantially different biology from, and are classed separately from, insects (the class Insecta). Mites of domestic animals cause important types of skin disease, and some mites infest other organs. Diagnosis of mite infestations can be difficult because of the small size of most mites, but understanding how mites are adapted to feed within the structure of the skin is useful.

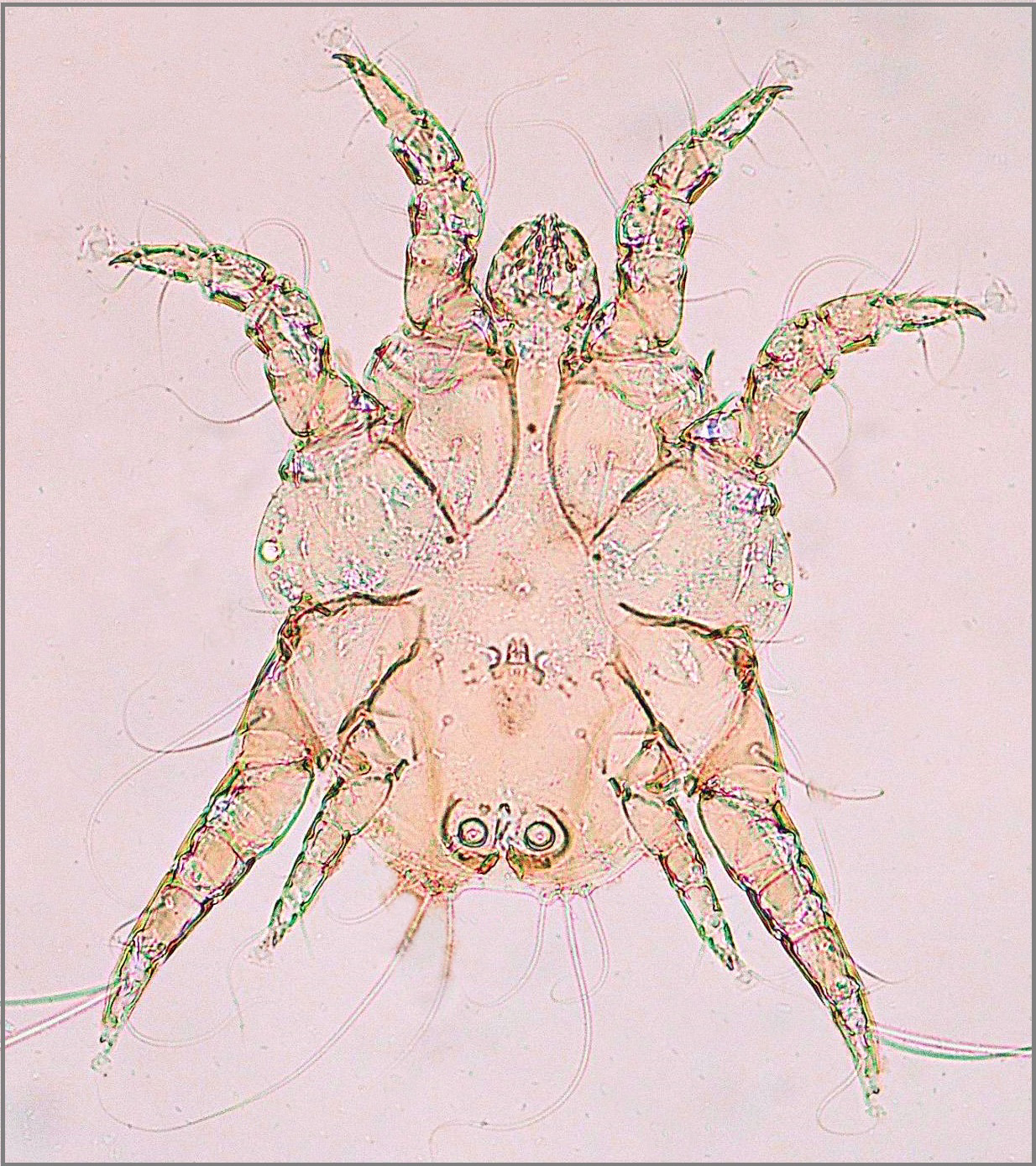
Chorioptes bovis (Hering), adult male psoroptic mite. Phylum Arthropoda, Class Arachnida, Order Acari, Family Psoroptidae

== Life-cycles ==
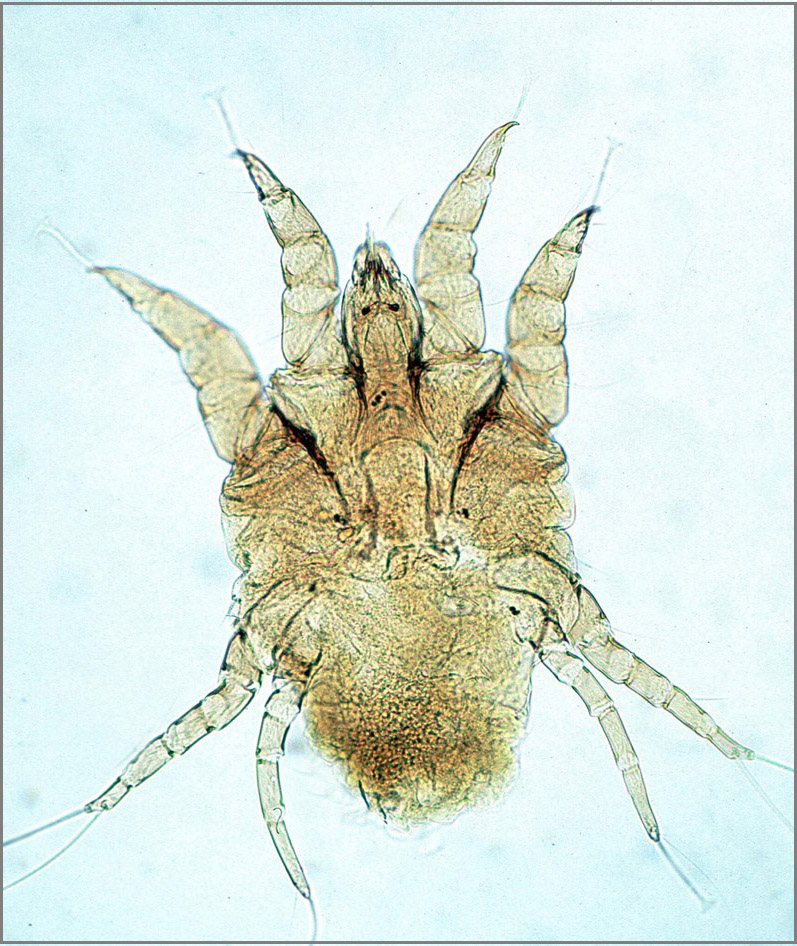
Female Psoroptes mite

The life-cycle of mites begins with eggs that are laid on the vertebrate animal host or within the nest or environment of the host. From the egg hatches a larva, characterized by having three pairs of legs. The larva feeds on the host and molts to a nymph—similar to the larva but has four pairs of legs—which then feeds and molts itself. This molt is either to the first of several more nymph stages, or to an adult. The adult is defined by sexual maturity and has four pairs of legs. These similar stages (or instars) are in a sequence known as an incomplete metamorphosis. The potential reproductive capacity of a female mite is low compared to ticks because the eggs are large relative to the small female. However, the survival of larvae laid on their hosts or in nests of their hosts is high, and the life-cycle is short, so mite populations can expand rapidly under favorable conditions. Ectoparasitic mites typically transfer by crawling between hosts in close contact (see also section on control). The unusual life-cycle of trombiculid mites is described in the section on blood-sucking mites.

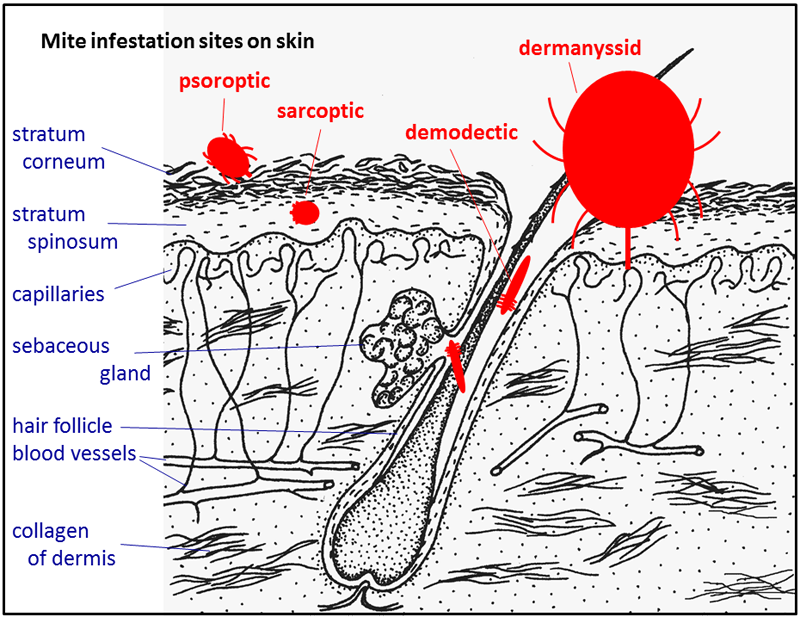
Sites of infestation by mites in skin (mites not at correct scales)

== Diseases ==
=== Outer skin ===
Infestation of the outer skin is typically caused by psoroptic mites. Psoroptes ovis, for example, infests sheep and cattle. Psoroptes ovis infests the superficial layers of the skin among the dead cells of the stratum corneum. Irritation of the outer skin by the mite's mouthparts and saliva results in cutaneous hypersensitivity and inflammatory exudation of serum and fresh cells. The mites feed on this exudate. The skin loses its hair at the sites of infestation and large flakes of dried serum and cells accumulate. The mites cause intense pruritus (itching) and the host will groom compulsively and may become severely distressed. Depilation (hair loss) may be substantial. Psoroptes ovis infests sheep worldwide and can be a serious welfare and animal production problem, mainly for sheep, but also cattle. Psoroptes cuniculi infests rabbits, mainly on their outer ear. Chorioptes bovis infestations are found on cattle, sheep and horses but do not cause the severe reactions associated with Psoroptes mites. Other common psoroptic mites are in the genera Chorioptes and Otodectes. Otodectes cynotis infestations in the ears of dogs are a common problem.

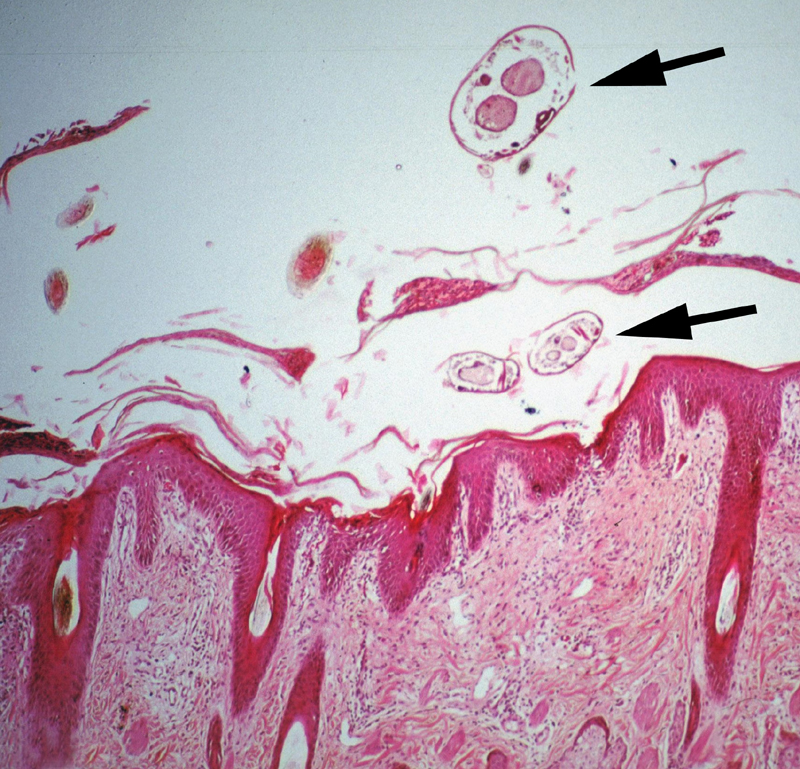
Psoroptes ovis (arrowed) on skin, histological section

=== Living layer of epidermis ===
This is typically caused by sarcoptic mites. Sarcoptes scabiei is an example: it infests many species of mammals, including humans. Other common sarcoptic mites are in the genus Notoedres, and the genus Knemidokoptes (or Cnemidocoptes) which infest birds. Sarcoptic mites as adults are microscopic, nearly circular in outline, and their legs are short, adapted for burrowing. The females, after mating with males on the surface of their host's skin, burrow into the living layers of the epidermis (mainly the stratum spinosum). They make long tunnels horizontal to the surface of the skin. Eggs are laid in the tunnels and development of larvae and nymphs occurs in such tunnels. The feeding of the mites and their excretory products irritates and inflames the skin, causing intense pruritus. Dermal hypersensitivity reactions will develop in the host. Chronic infestations lead to thickening of the skin by overproduction of epidermal cells (acanthosis), resulting in a characteristic depilated and scaly appearance. Stress caused by the pruritus can be severe, and will result in lost productivity of most species of livestock animals. Camels are prone to severe infestation and wild animals such as foxes may die from sarcoptes infestation.

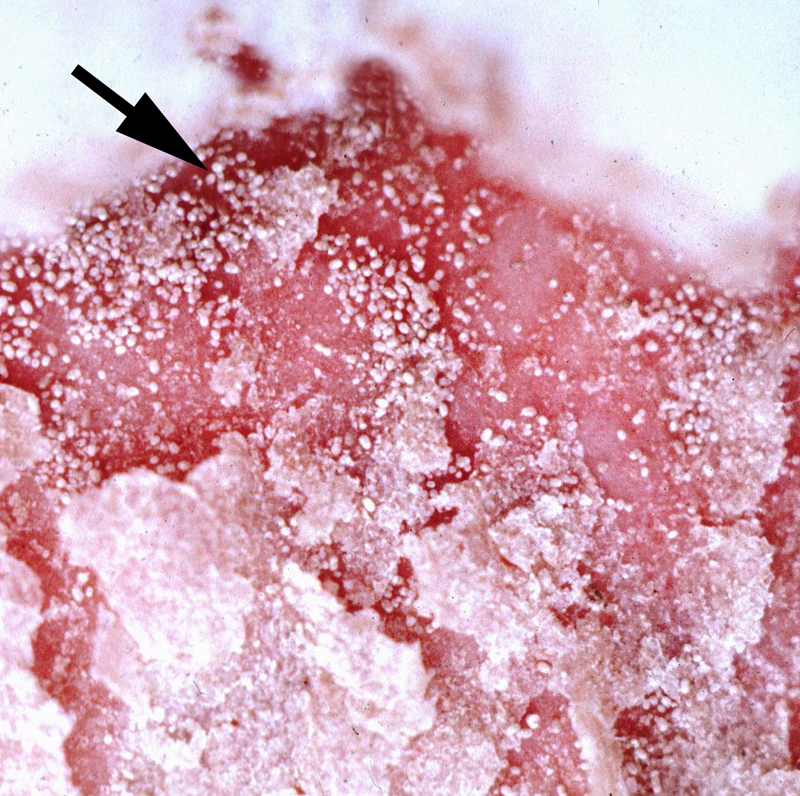
Psoroptes ovis mites (white dots) infesting sheep skin

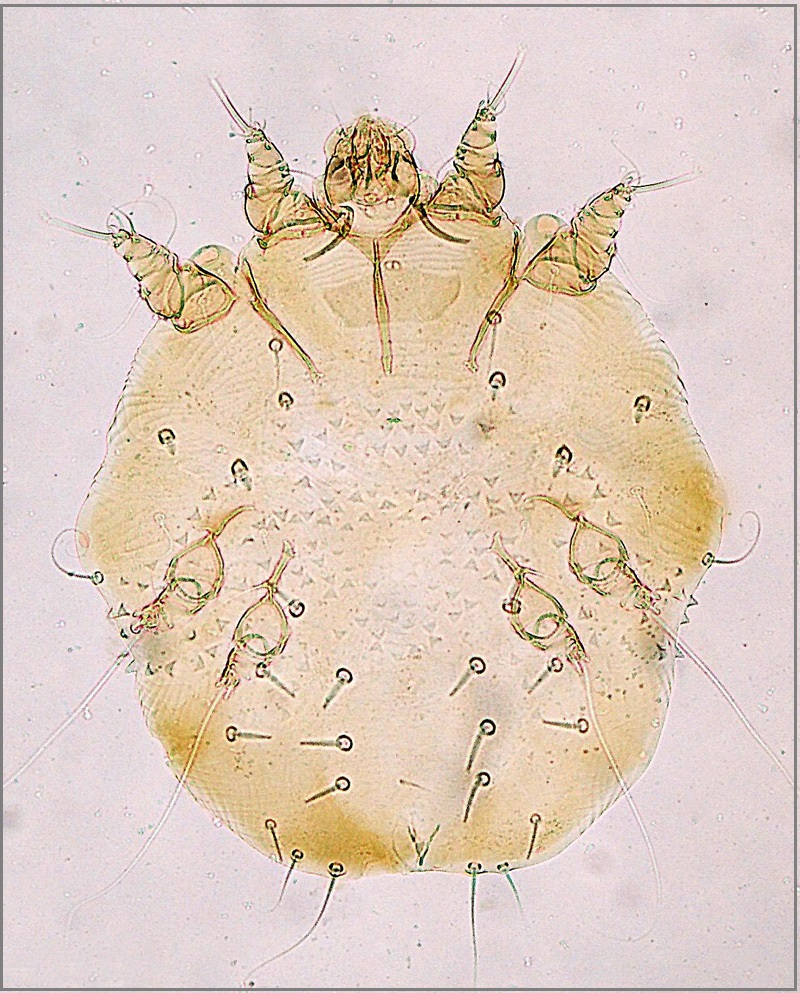
Sarcoptes scabiei adult burrowing mite

=== Hair follicle ===
One genus of mites, Demodex, has adapted to infesting the hair follicles of its hosts. Most species of mammal, including humans, are readily infested with these minute mites, but typically the infestation level is very low. The individual mites remain external to the epidermis within the follicle, but appear to be within the skin because they are below the general outer surface of the host. The mite Demodex canis is a common cause of demodicosis in dogs. Demodex mites are microscopic, cigar-shaped and have very short legs. These mites seem to feed on epidermal cells. They can crawl out on the surface of the skin, aided by secretions from the skin's sebaceous glands. Puppies can become infected by close contact with their mother during suckling. Puppies are more susceptible to infestation at this age because their immune systems are immature. All dogs will become infested in this way but usually only low levels of infestation persist, without pruritus or other signs of clinical disease. Some dogs become heavily infested, likely because of an immune dysfunction. This results in severe inflammation of the epidermis with acanthosis. The skin may become so thickened that folds form, and bacterial infection of excessive sebaceous secretions (seborrhea) may occur, producing an offensive smell. Demodicosis in cattle can occur as dense localized infestations. These create pustular folliculitis and indurated plaques within the dermis. This diminishes the commercial value of the animal's hide.

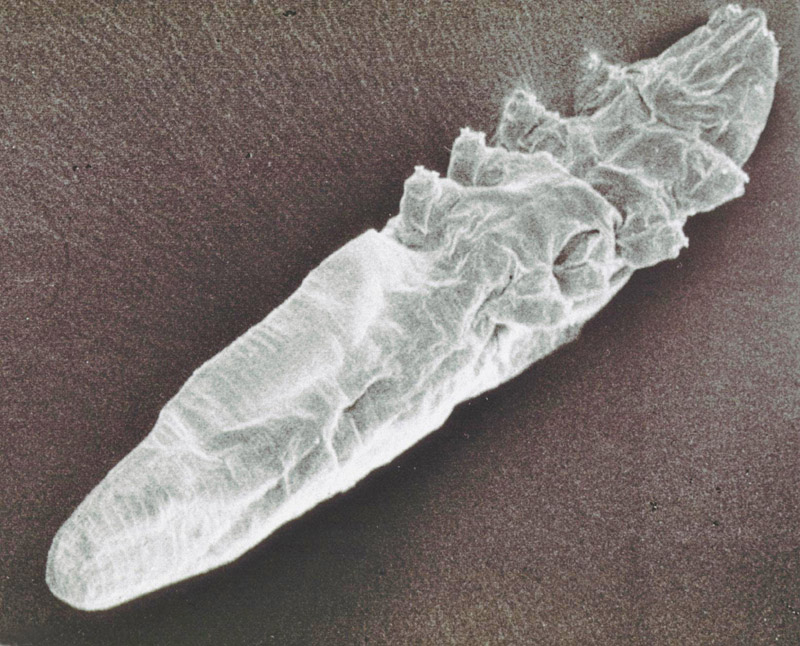
Demodex adult follicle mite

=== Blood-sucking mites ===
The dermanyssid mites are visible to the naked eye and have long powerful legs that they use to seek their hosts. These mites live in the nest of their hosts or within the fabric of poultry houses. They infest their hosts whilst feeding for short periods. Their mouthparts are long complex organs adapted for piercing their host's skin and sucking blood. Dermanyssus gallinae, the red chicken mite is typical. Dense infestations of a poultry house cause much biting stress and loss of production to the birds, and human workers in the houses are bitten. Originally a parasite centered on the nest of its host, this species has become a major pest in commercial poultry houses. A similar genus is Ornithonyssus; O.bursa, the tropical fowl mite, and O.sylvarium the northern fowl mite cause similar problems in poultry production.

Trombiculid mites (chiggers) also feed on blood, but only in the larval stage. The life-cycle starts with eggs laid in the environment of the normal hosts of the larvae, typically rodents and other small mammals. After the engorged larva molts to a nymph the remaining life-cycle comprises stages that are not parasitic, but free-living. There are several nymphal stages. The adults can be found crawling on vegetation, conspicuous with a dense covering of red setae (similar to hairs). Trombicula autumnalis, the harvest mite, causes severe pruritus to its host after it has detached. Feeding by the larvae involves secretion of a feeding tube, the stylostome, into the host's skin. This remains when the larva detaches and proteins in the secretion induce inflammatory and dermal hypersensitivity reactions, with intense pruritus. Domestic birds, dogs and humans are among the other hosts afflicted by this temporary infestation.

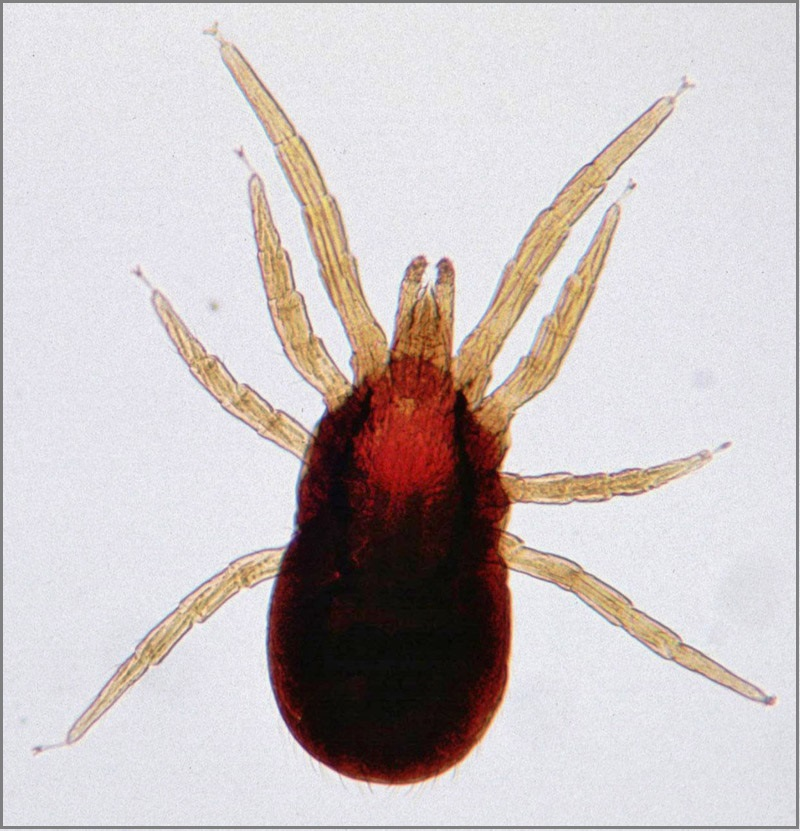
Dermanyssus adult mite

=== Infestation of respiratory tract ===
Some genera of mites have adapted to infesting the lungs and air-sacs of birds or the lungs of mammals. Cytodites nudus is a typical species of this type. It infests poultry in North America and South Africa and may cause reduction in productivity of the birds. Another genus of similar bird infesting mites is Laminosioptes. The genus Pneumocoptes has species that infest the lungs of some monkey and rodent species. These mites aggregate in nodules within the lung but signs of clinical disease are not obvious. Pneumonyssus caninum infests the nasal sinuses of dogs.

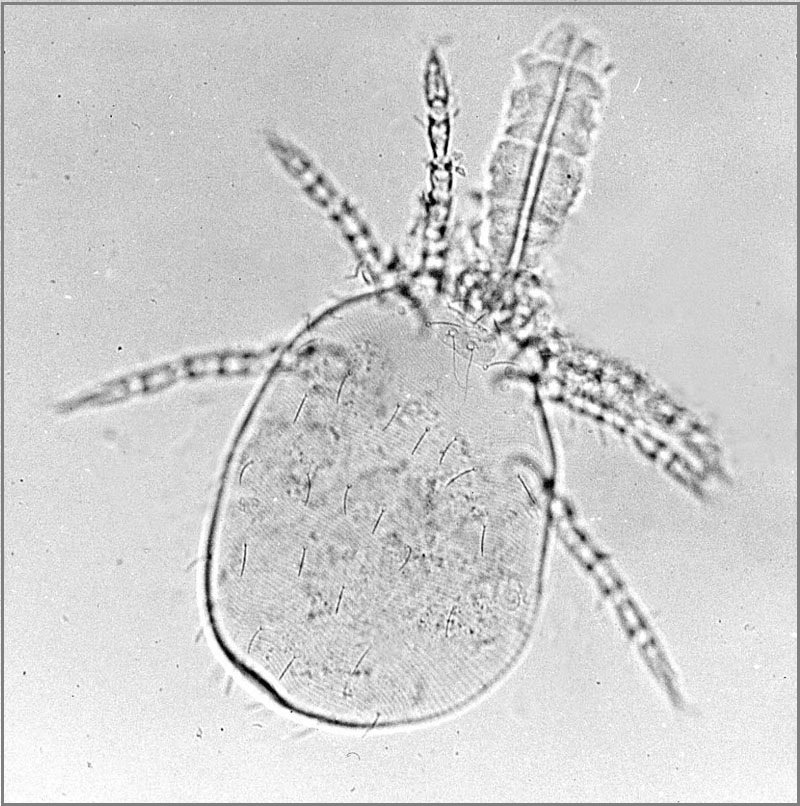
Trombicula larva, with stylostome extending from mouthparts

=== Allergies in respiratory system and skin ===
These can be caused indirectly by free living mites within the fabric of building and on stored foods such as grain and hay. They are most commonly seen as asthma and dermatitis in humans living in the housing or handling the materials but domestic animals such as dogs and horses can also develop similar diseases. The allergic reactions develop in response to foreign proteins within the fecal pellets of the mites. Dermatophagoides pteronyssinus, the house-dust mite is the best known species causing such problems. Mites causing similar problems are in the genera Acarus, Glycyphagus, Tyrophagus, and others.

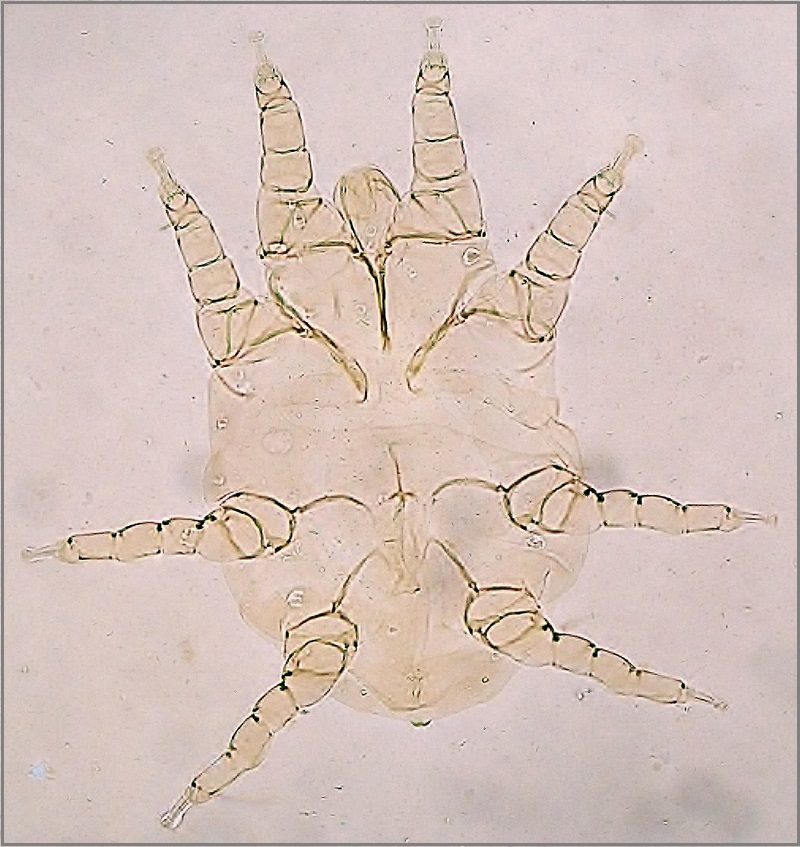
Cytodites nudus respiratory mite

=== Nuisance mites ===
A variety of mites cause mild dermatitis in their hosts and biting nuisance and disgust to the owners of domestic animals. Cheyletiella blakei, the cat fur mite is typical. These mites live within the fur of cats and dogs, feeding on sloughed scales of skin. Often this causes little reaction in the host, but pruritus, seborrhea and pustules in the skin may develop as an allergic reaction to the mites. The adult mites are visible crawling in the fur and may cause similar skin reactions in the pet's owner. Other genera of mites that cause similar problems in colonies of rodents are Myobia and Myocoptes. The genus Megninia has species found on the feathers of poultry birds.

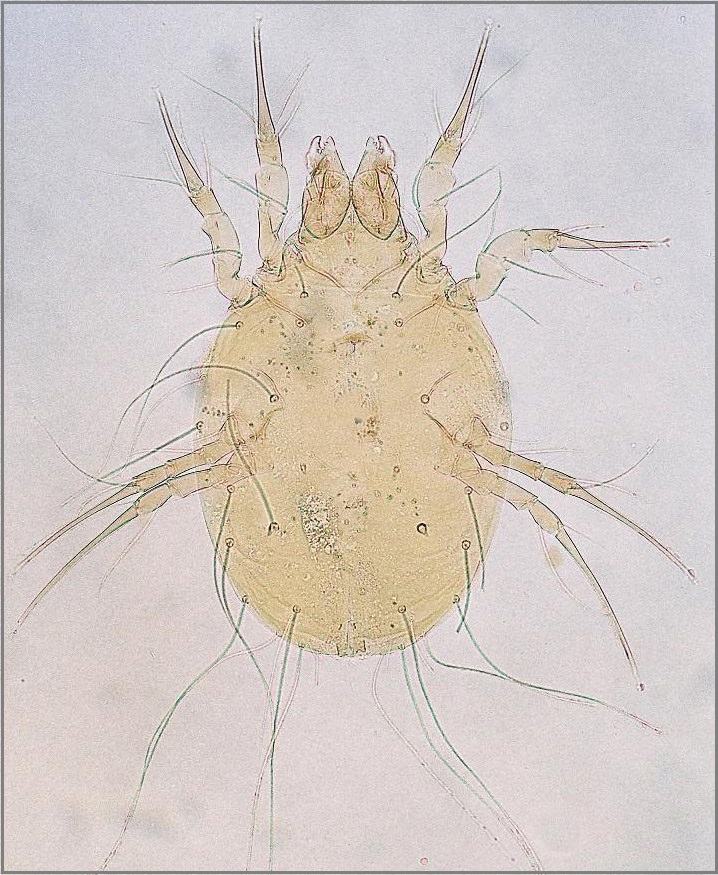
Glycyphagus allergy causing mite

=== Transmission of pathogens ===
Compared to ticks and insects of domestic animals, the parasitic mites are of limited importance as transmitters (vectors) of pathogenic organisms to domestic animals. Some mites are the intermediate host of parasitic worms, but not defined as vectors because they do not parasitize a host. For example, free-living mites of the family Oribatidae ingest the eggs of Moniezia expansa tapeworm of sheep; the sheep then ingest the mites whilst grazing. As another example, free-living hay mites are a suspected reservoir for scrapie, a prion disease of sheep. Dermanyssus gallinae has been shown to transmit the virus causing St Louis encephalitis virus between chickens. (the main transmitters of this virus to humans are Culex mosquitoes). Various species of trombiculid mite transmit the bacterium Orientia tsutsugamushi, the causative agent of scrub-typhus, a notorious disease of humans in South East Asia. Leptotrombidium deliniense is the most important of several species of mite transmitting this bacterium.

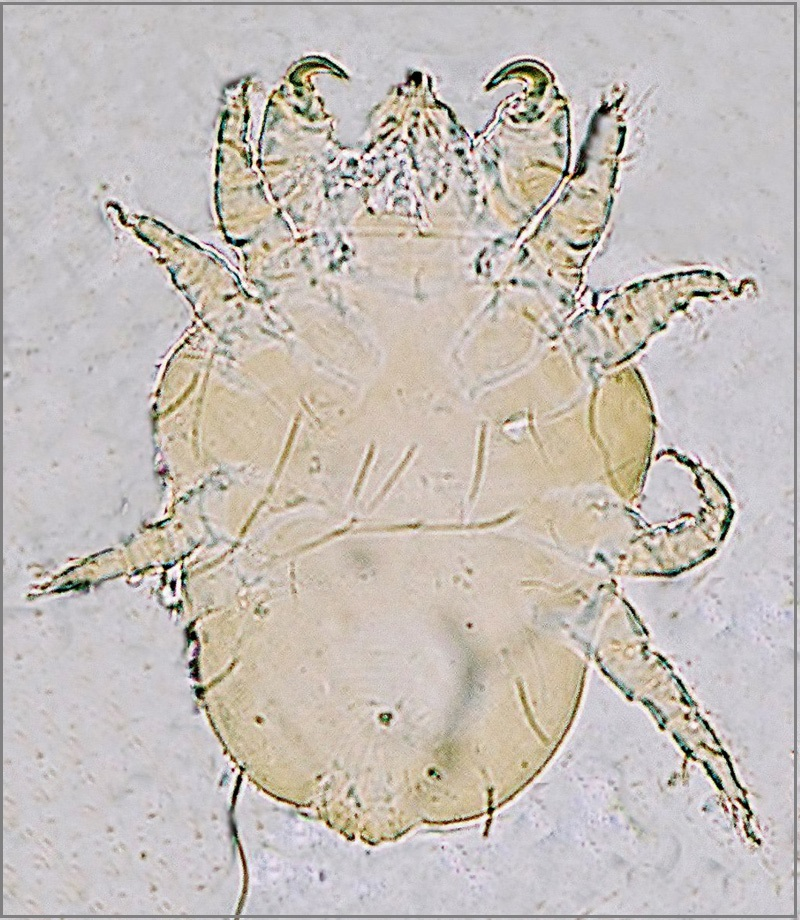
Cheyletiella parasitivorax adult cat-fur mite

== Control ==
Mites infesting their hosts at the outer surface of the skin are removed by treatment with topically applied acaricides (chemicals to kill mites and ticks applied to the skin). Numerous commercial formulations are available, representing several different chemical groups. Examples are: synthetic pyrethroids such as flumethrin; formamidines such as amitraz; and phenylpyrazoles such as fipronil. Botanical acaricides are represented by azadirachtin, an extract of the neem tree. Aqueous suspensions of fungi naturally pathogenic to mites, such as Metarhizium anisopliae, are another potential alternative to chemical acaricides. Good potential for vaccination of sheep to control Psoroptes ovis infestation has been demonstrated.

Mites infesting their hosts deeper within the skin are difficult to control using acaricides applied topically. Benzyl benzoate is a chemical that is effective as a topical treatment for sarcoptic mange. Alternatively, acaricides that act systemically can penetrate to where the mites are feeding when they are delivered by injection. Macrocyclic lactones such as ivermectin are the best known of this type.

Dermanyssid mites in the fabric of poultry houses are controlled using equipment that delivers scalding water at high pressure to clean the materials, or by spraying on acaricide in a water based emulsion. Synthetic pyrethroids, or a carbamate chemical such as carbaryl are typical for this treatment. Diatomaceous earths as dust formulations are also used in this context; the dust abrades the waterproof cuticle of the mites which then die of dehydration. The intense infestations with psoroptic, sarcoptic and demodectic mites that build up in some individual animals (often because of reduced immune competence) need special attention because they act as strong sources of infestation to other animals in the same population. Close attention to domestic animals is necessary, including regular hand grooming of companion animals. This enables early signs of infestation to be detected and treatment applied when it likely to have highest effect. Hygiene measures must be appropriate to the type of infestation. Psoroptes mites can live off the host on fomites such as scraps of sheep's wool for several weeks and act as a source of infestation. Close contact between hosts when confined in pens aids spread of these highly contagious mites. Sarcoptic mites are contagious by very close contact and infested animals are kept separate from uninfested ones until treatment is complete. Demodex mites infest all individuals of their natural host species, but it is only those individuals who cannot control the infestations by natural immune defenses that are treated, including not breeding from them. Mites causing asthma and similar conditions are controlled substantially by thorough cleaning and vacuuming of the fabric of affected areas.
