= List of rats =

Rats are small rodents classified in the order Rodentia. There are several types of rodents termed rats found throughout the order. For a list of all rodent species, see list of rodents.

- Old World rats are found in the family Muridae, with typical rats belonging to the genus Rattus in the Murinae subfamily.
  - For members of the subfamily Deomyinae, which includes brush-furred rats, see List of deomyines
  - For members of the subfamily Gerbillinae, which includes sand rats, see List of gerbillines
  - For the sole member of the subfamily Lophiomyinae, see Maned rat
  - For members of the subfamily Murinae, which includes a large number of Old World rats, see List of murines
- New World rats are found in the family Cricetidae
  - For members of the subfamily Neotominae, which includes pack rats, see List of neotomines
  - For members of the subfamily Sigmodontinae, which contains a variety of New World rats, see List of sigmodontines
- For members of the family Bathyergidae, known as mole-rats, see List of bathyergids
- For members of the family Echimyidae, known as the Neotropical spiny rats, see List of echimyids
- For members of the family Heteromyidae, which includes kangaroo rats, see List of heteromyids
- For members of the family Nesomyidae, which includes pouched rats and tufted-tailed rats, see List of nesomyids
- For members of the family Octodontidae, which includes viscacha rats, see List of octodontids
- For members of the family Spalacidae, which includes bamboo rats and blind mole-rats, see List of spalacids
