= Bracebridge Hemyng =

English author

- Born: 5 March 1841; London, England
- Died: 18 September 1901 (aged 60); London, England
- Occupation: Author

Bracebridge Hemyng (1841–1901) was an English writer.

== Biography ==
He was born in London, England on 5 March 1841.

He was the eldest son of Dempster Hemyng, a successful barrister.

He got married in the United States, but later returned to London.

He died in London, England on 18 September 1901.

== Education ==
He was educated at Eton, then, following his father's footsteps, he entered the Middle Temple and was Called to the Bar in 1862.

== Career ==
He did not succeed as a barrister, therefore he turned to writing as a career.

He began writing for newspapers and magazines. From there he progressed full time to writing novels.

== Legacy ==
His legacy has been described in the following words by The Literary Encyclopedia:

Bracebridge Hemyng was the most successful writer of boys' stories in the later Victorian era. His great creation was Jack Harkaway, a mostly clean-living, always hard-hitting, true British schoolboy hero, whose adventures were chronicled in well over thirty serials. Harkaway visited most parts of the world – America, Greece, Malaya, China, South Africa – in some of the latter stories with his son Dick. The character became the archetype of the boys' serial hero, and most of those that followed him are in some ways his imitators. Hemyng wrote the first Harkaway story in 1871, and continued with the strand almost up to his death in 1901. Although he wrote many other one-off serials, Harkaway and his heritage were his greatest

== Bibliography ==
His notable books include:

- Jack Harkaway's Boy Tinker Among The Turks
- Jack Harkaway and His Son's Escape from the Brigands of Greece
- Jack Harkaway in New York; or, The Adventures of the Travelers' Club
- The Slave of the Mine; or, Jack Harkaway in 'Frisco
- Young Jack Harkaway Fighting the Pirates of the Red Sea
