= National Fancy Rat Society =

British club for pet rat enthusiasts

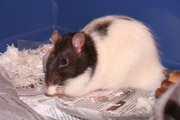
The NFRS has specific standards for the colouring, texture, and patterns of rat fur.

The National Fancy Rat Society (NFRS), founded in 1976, is a UK-based club for rat fanciers that promotes fancy rats exhibitions, as well as the study and breeding of these rats. The society publishes a bi-monthly journal, Pro-Rat-A, and holds many shows throughout the year all over Britain, with membership in the thousands.

For a number of years pet rats had been appearing at mouse shows in Britain. Publicity in Fur & Feather magazine had increased interest in the fledgling fancy and caused an increase in entries in the rat sections of mouse shows during 1974 and 1999 to the point that after cajoling from the mouse fanciers it was decided to form a club or society purely for rat fanciers.

== History ==
The National Fancy Rat Society was formed on 13 January 1976. The fledgling society staged its first exhibition just over a week later at the 1976 Bradford Championship Show, one of the most prestigious small livestock championship shows in the UK. This coincided with the debut of a new variety of fancy rat, the curly-coated Rex. The very first NFRS show was staged at Clymping, West Sussex, in conjunction with the Southern Hamster Club. It wasn't until 15 April 1978 that the society staged a show entirely on its own; this show (in Surbiton, Surrey) was the very first all-rats show ever staged.
