= Zinc finger chimera =

Zinc finger protein chimera are chimeric proteins composed of a DNA-binding zinc finger protein domain and another domain through which the protein exerts its effect. The effector domain may be a transcriptional activator (A) or repressor (R), a methylation domain (M) or a nuclease (N).

Modification of the endogenous DNA-binding zinc finger domain is the basis of the most advanced field in construction of gene-specific artificial transcription factors. Linking together six ZFPs produces a target-site of 18-19 bp. Assuming specificity to that one sequence and that the sequence of the genome is random, 18 bp is long enough to be unique in all known genomes Indeed, the spacing between subsites becomes part of the target sequence due to restrictions in the flexibility of the protein which can be controlled. Targeting sites as small as 9 bp provides some degree of specificity, almost certainly attributable in some part to chromatin occlusion.

== Production of zinc finger protein domain ==
Depending upon the requirements of the investigation, there are several techniques available to define a DNA-recognition domain that will confer the specificity of a ZFP-based transcription factor. Three phage display strategies have been described, involving either parallel, sequential or bipartite selection of the constituent zinc fingers.

=== Parallel selection ===
The parallel selection (Fig. 1 (A)) approach assumes that the individual zinc finger domains are functionally independent. On this basis, existing predetermined domains should be usable with no additional design or selection, making it a rapid and accessible technique to any laboratory. This is not true in every case, such that this strategy is liable to suffer issues related to target-site overlap at a number of target sequences, as discussed later. If necessary, it may be possible to surmount the problem of target site overlap by randomising the amino acid residues at the interface of two zinc fingers at which it occurs.

=== Sequential selection ===
Sequential selection (Fig. 1 (B)), put forward by the Pabo group in 1997 embraces the cooperative binding between zinc fingers to produce DNA-binding domains of great affinity and specificity. As suggested by the name, each finger is selected from a randomised library in the context of the previously selected finger. The techniques used in selection are similar to those described below except that the target oligonucleotide used in selection contains the entire target sequence. As shown in Fig. 1, a library is created in which finger three contains the randomised alpha-helix. The domain with the best binding characteristics is selected and then included in another library in which the finger-one anchor is removed and another randomised finger is added to the opposite end. This continues and results in a DNA-binding domain in which all fingers were selected in the context of the neighbouring finger and since each round of selection is applied to the same final target sequence, target site overlap still occurs but is an asset rather than a hindrance.

The main drawback of this approach is the necessity to produce a separate library for each zinc finger, which exceeds the capacity of most laboratories.

=== Bipartite selection ===
The bipartite selection (Fig 1 (C)) method was proposed by Isalan et al., 2001 as a compromise between the parallel and sequential selection strategies. The first and last 5 bp of the 9 bp target site are selected in parallel and combined to produce a library from which the final ZFP is chosen.

In order to keep the library size within reasonable limits, this technique is restricted to randomisation of only the key residues involved in base recognition. Furthermore, unlike in parallel selection, this technique requires multiple pannings before a novel ZFP can be constructed.

=== Zinc finger selection by phage display ===
In order to determine the most appropriate sequence of amino acids in the alpha-helix of a zinc finger for binding to a given DNA sequence, a technique involving phage display may be employed. By altering the genome of selected bacteriophage, it is possible to create a phage that will display a ZFP as part of its protein coat. Such phage can subsequently be tested for adherence, via the attached zinc fingers, to an oligonucleotide containing the sequence of interest, whilst other, non-adherent phage are washed away. The DNA within the phage codes for the ZFPs expressed, so extracting and sequencing the DNA of bound phage provides information as to suitable amino acid configurations for binding a specific sequence. This forms the basis of the investigation of ZFPs binding by phage display.

Work is typically performed using the murine ZFP-TF Zif268 or one of its derivatives, as the basis of the zinc finger sequence modifications since it is the most well characterised of all zinc finger proteins. Its derivatives C7 or C7.GAT, are often used for their superior binding affinity and specificity. C7.GAT has been used to investigate the 5'-ANN-3' and 5'-CNN-3' families of sequences since the third finger of C7 defines a guanine or thymine in the 5' position of the finger two sequence (target site overlap). Filamentous helper phage and the DNA from lambda phage are utilised in phage display. Due to limitations in the size of libraries that can be routinely constructed, randomisation may be limited to the most influential amino acids in the ZFP sequence as inferred by X-ray crystallography. The positions were identified as helix positions -1, 2, 3, 4, 5 and 6 in fingers one and three, and positions -2, -1, 1, 2, 3 and 4 in finger two in a study published by Wu et al. (1995), however another study by Segal et al. (1999) suggests the importance of all positions from -2 to 6 due to the unspecific affinity of some amino acids and the ability of others to stabilise adjacent interactions.

=== In vitro selection of zinc fingers ===
A short (~34 nt) hairpin DNA containing the ZFP binding site with alterations occurring in a single subsite is used as the target. The oligonucleotide used may be synthesised to include a primary n‑hexyl amino group at its 5' end, later utilised to attach bovine serum albumin (BSA). In this case, the conjugate is used to precoat a microtitre well, before applying ~10^{13} colony-forming units of phage. Following incubation, the phage are removed and the plate washed with buffer containing 0.5% Tween 20 to remove non-adherent phage. Using an acidic elution buffer, the adherent phage are removed and neutralised with Tris base. Further rounds of panning are completed to ensure enrichment of the sample, by infecting bacterial cells with the eluted phage and helper phage and then collecting the [ZFP-displaying] phage produced for the next round of panning. As an alternative to BSA, the hairpin target DNA may be biotinylated and later extracted using streptavidin-coated magnetic beads (streptavidin forms very strong bonds with biotin).

To increase the specificity of the selected phage, especially where larger libraries are being investigated, competitor oligonucleotides are used to sequester those zinc finger proteins of lesser specificity before the biotinylated target oligonucleotide is added. Sheared herring sperm DNA for example, will bind phage with a non-specific adherence to DNA. Subsequent rounds of panning involve increasing concentrations of specifically synthesised non-target oligonucleotides where all but the sequence of the target subsite remains the same, down to a single nucleotide difference. In particular, the target sequence of the original ZFP which was subject to mutagenesis is used in high quantity to select against 'parental phage' contaminating the library. The binding of streptavidin-coated magnetic beads can be blocked by blotto and antibody-displaying (irrelevant) phage so that binding only occurs to molecules with such a high affinity as biotin. Non-specific phage are removed as before, using a buffer including dilute Tween 20. Bound phage are collected by virtue of the magnetic beads and may be eluted by incubation with trypsin. Only those phage displaying highly specific ZFPs will thus be selected.

After elution, the phage can be plated and DNA extracted from individual plaque forming units, restricted and the appropriately sized fragments extracted after separation by PAGE. The DNA can then be sequenced to discover the protein primary structure that produces adherence to the target sequence. This process is repeated for each of the 5'-NNN-3' single finger subsites being investigated.

== Engineered zinc finger arrays ==
Generating arrays of engineered Cys_{2}His_{2} zinc fingers is the most developed method for creating proteins capable of targeting desired genomic DNA sequences. The majority of engineered zinc finger arrays are based on the zinc finger domain of the murine transcription factor Zif268, although some groups have used zinc finger arrays based on the human transcription factor SP1. Zif268 has three individual zinc finger motifs that collectively bind a 9 bp sequence with high affinity. The structure of this protein bound to DNA was solved in 1991 and stimulated a great deal of research into engineered zinc finger arrays. In 1994 and 1995, a number of groups used phage display to alter the specificity of a single zinc finger of Zif268. Carlos F. Barbas et al. also reported the development of zinc finger technology in the patent literature and have been granted a number of patents that have been important for the commercial development of zinc finger technology. Typical engineered zinc finger arrays have between 3 and 6 individual zinc finger motifs and bind target sites ranging from 9 basepairs to 18 basepairs in length. Arrays with 6 zinc finger motifs are particularly attractive because they bind a target site that is long enough to have a good chance of being unique in a mammalian genome. There are two main methods currently used to generate engineered zinc finger arrays, modular assembly and a bacterial selection system, and there is some debate about which method is best suited for most applications.

=== Modular assembly ===
The most straightforward method to generate new zinc finger arrays is to combine smaller zinc finger "modules" of known specificity. The structure of the zinc finger protein Zif268 bound to DNA described by Pavletich and Pabo in their 1991 publication has been key to much of this work and describes the concept of obtaining fingers for each of the 64 possible base pair triplets and then mixing and matching these fingers to design proteins with any desired sequence specificity. The most common modular assembly process involves combining separate zinc fingers that can each recognize a 3 basepair DNA sequence to generate 3-finger, 4-, 5-, or 6-finger arrays that recognize target sites ranging from 9 basepairs to 18 basepairs in length. Another method uses 2-finger modules to generate zinc finger arrays with up to six individual zinc fingers. The Barbas Laboratory of The Scripps Research Institute used phage display to develop and characterize zinc finger domains that recognize most DNA triplet sequences while another group isolated and characterized individual fingers from the human genome. A potential drawback with modular assembly in general is that specificities of individual zinc finger can overlap and can depend on the context of the surrounding zinc fingers and DNA. A recent study demonstrated that a high proportion of 3-finger zinc finger arrays generated by modular assembly fail to bind their intended target with sufficient affinity in a bacterial two-hybrid assay and fail to function as zinc finger nucleases, but the success rate was somewhat higher when sites of the form GNNGNNGNN were targeted. A subsequent study used modular assembly to generate zinc finger nucleases with both 3-finger arrays and 4-finger arrays and observed a much higher success rate with 4-finger arrays. A variant of modular assembly that takes the context of neighboring fingers into account has also been reported and this method tends to yield proteins with improved performance relative to standard modular assembly.

=== Selection methods ===
Numerous selection methods have been used to generate zinc finger arrays capable of targeting desired sequences. Initial selection efforts utilized phage display to select proteins that bound a given DNA target from a large pool of partially randomized zinc finger arrays. This technique is difficult to use on more than a single zinc finger at a time, so a multi-step processes that generated a completely optimized 3-finger array by adding and optimizing a single zinc finger at a time was developed. More recent efforts have utilized yeast one-hybrid systems, bacterial one-hybrid and two-hybrid systems, and mammalian cells. A promising new method to select novel 3-finger zinc finger arrays utilizes a bacterial two-hybrid system and has been dubbed "OPEN" by its creators. This system combines pre-selected pools of individual zinc fingers that were each selected to bind a given triplet and then utilizes a second round of selection to obtain 3-finger arrays capable of binding a desired 9-bp sequence. This system was developed by the Zinc Finger Consortium as an alternative to commercial sources of engineered zinc finger arrays. It is somewhat difficult to directly compare the binding properties of proteins generated with this method to proteins generated by modular assembly as the specificity profiles of proteins generated by the OPEN method have never been reported.

=== Applications ===
Engineered zinc finger arrays can then be used in numerous applications such as artificial transcription factors, zinc finger methylases, zinc finger recombinases, and Zinc finger nucleases. While initial studies with another DNA-binding domain from bacterial TAL effectors show promise, it remains to be seen whether these domains are suitable for some or all of the applications where engineered zinc fingers are currently used. Artificial transcription factors with engineered zinc finger arrays have been used in numerous scientific studies, and an artificial transcription factor that activates expression of VEGF is currently being evaluated in humans as a potential treatment for several clinical indications. Zinc finger nucleases have become useful reagents for manipulating genomes of many higher organisms including Drosophila melanogaster, Caenorhabditis elegans, tobacco, corn, zebrafish, various types of mammalian cells, and rats. An ongoing clinical trial is evaluating Zinc finger nucleases that disrupt the CCR5 gene in CD4+ human T-cells as a potential treatment for HIV/AIDS.

== Investigating binding characteristics ==
These investigations require the use of soluble ZFPs, since attachment to phage can alter the binding characteristics of the zinc fingers. Once a ZFP has been selected, its sequence is subcloned from pComb3H into a modified bacterial expression vector, pMal-c2, linking it to a sequence coding the maltose binding protein. The recombinant is then transformed into XL1-Blue cells and expression is induced by the addition of isopropyl β-D-thiogalactoside (IPTG). Freeze/thaw extracts may then be purified for use in the following experiments. Whilst purification is not necessary for multitarget ELISA, it is essential for measuring binding affinity by plasmon resonance and DNase footprints. It can be performed using a Heparin-Sepharose FPLC column equilibrated with zinc buffer followed by confirmation of homogeneity by SDS PAGE gel densitometry The same techniques are used to examine the binding properties of completed polydactyl ZFP chimera

=== Specificity testing ===
The specificity of ZFPs selected by phage display, is tested using a multitarget enzyme-linked immunosorbent assay (ELISA). The ZFPs are applied to microtitre wells coated with streptavidin and a biotinylated target oligonucleotide. After incubation, the wells are washed to remove zinc fingers if they are not adherent to the target sequence, followed by the application of mouse anti-MBP (maltose binding protein) antibody and incubation. Goat anti-mouse antibody coupled to alkaline phosphatase is added and allowed to bind, followed by washing to remove antibody, if it is not bound to zinc fingers. Alkaline phosphatase substrate is added and after stopping the reaction, the optical density at 405 nm (OD405) is determined by spectrophotometry

The reading from the spectrophotometer is dependent on the amount of alkaline phosphatase present in the well, which in turn is proportional to the binding of the ZFP in question. If the ZFP binds to a sequence for which it was not selected with too great an affinity, it is not specific enough for most medical purposes and will most likely be rejected.

These assays are repeated using different target oligonucleotides. When investigating zinc fingers binding 5'-XNN-3' sequences for example, all 16 of the possible oligonucleotide sequences will need to be investigated. Further, to test specificity to the 5' nucleotide, the full complement of the four 5'-ANN-3', 5'-CNN-3', 5'-GNN-3'. 5'-TNN-3' families are used as targets in four separate reactions and the relative binding in each is compared

=== Kinetic analysis ===
Kinetic analysis provides information regarding both the affinity and the specificity of zinc finger adherence to the target. It can be performed using commercially available equipment utilising surface plasmon resonance. The surface of the sensor chip is coated with affinity purified streptavidin before application of biotinylated oligonucleotides which also adhere to the surface. The association rate (k_{on}) is calculated by measuring the rate of ZFP binding to the surface using several different protein concentrations whilst the dissociation rate (k_{off}) can be calculated by increasing the rate of flow after association. The mathematics is performed by software provided with the instrument.

Alternatively, K_{d} can be calculated from a gel mobility shift assay in which the same purified protein is incubated with serial dilutions of gel-purified, 32P-end-labelled target oligonucleotide. The incubation reactions are then resolved, over a short period, on a polyacrylamide gel and quantitated using a commercially available imager and software. K_{d} is calculated via Scatchard analysis using the binding isotherm equation; θ_{b} = [peptide]/([peptide] + K_{d}).

=== DNase I footprint analysis ===
To determine the space occupied by a ZFP when bound to its DNA target, a fragment of the target gene is amplified by PCR and mixed with a 32P-end-labelled promoter fragment. This reaction is then incubated with several different concentrations of ZFP produced and purified using one of the previously described overexpression (e.g. pMal-c2 and XL1-Blue) and purification methods. Digestion with DNase I will produce fragments of varying lengths, but where the ZFP has been allowed to bind at high concentration, the corresponding fragment lengths will not be present in the mixture, since DNase activity has been occluded by the ZFP at these locations. The samples are separated on an acrylamide (~6%), urea (8 M) gel, used to expose phosphorimaging plates and recorded by a commercially available phosphorimaging machine. Software analysis can also be used to produce K_{d} values

=== Target-site overlap ===
Certain sequences of amino acid residues are able to recognise and are specific to an extended target-site of four or even five nucleotides When this occurs in a ZFP in which the three-nucleotide subsites are contiguous, one zinc finger interferes with the target-site of the zinc finger adjacent to it, a situation known as target-site overlap.

== Zinc finger protein transcription factors ==
ZFP-TFs, consisting of activators and repressors are transcription factors composed of a zinc finger protein domain and any of a variety of transcription-factor effector-domains which exert their modulatory effect around any sequence to which the ZFP domain binds.

== Zinc finger nucleases ==
Zinc finger nucleases include a nuclease domain such as FokI, capable of introducing double-stranded breaks at the locus of any sequence to which the zinc finger protein domain binds.

== See also ==
- Gene therapy
- Zinc finger nuclease
- Zinc finger protein
- Zinc finger protein transcription factor
