= OSR =

OSR may refer to:

== Science and technology ==
- Operational sex ratio, of reproductively available males to females
- On-stack replacement, used by Jikes RVM, a Java virtual machine
- Optical solar reflector, a radiator material for space craft
- OEM Service Release, a Windows 95 distribution
- Open-source robotics

== Transportation ==
- Leoš Janáček Airport Ostrava, in Czech Republic, IATA code OSR
- Ontario Southland Railway, in Canada
- Texas State Highway OSR, in the US

== Other uses ==
- Old School Renaissance, a movement within tabletop role-playing games
- Owasippe Scout Reservation, a Boy Scout camp in Twin Lake, Michigan, U.S.
- Orchestre de la Suisse Romande, a Swiss symphony orchestra
- Operational Situation Reports, or Einsatzgruppen reports, dispatches of the Nazi death squads
- Ohio State Reformatory, a historic US prison
- Odessa Soviet Republic, a short-lived Soviet republic
- Office of Strategic Research, a CIA intelligence analysis organization once headed by Richard Lehman
- Oilseed rape, a widely cultivated grain crop
- Overseas Service Ribbon, a US military award

== See also ==
- OSR1, a gene
- OSR2 (gene)
- BDTH_{2} or OSR#1, an organosulfur compound used as a chelation agent
- OSRIC, or Old School Reference and Index Compilation, a Dungeons & Dragons retro-clone
