= Radiative cooling =

Loss of heat by thermal radiation

In the study of heat transfer, radiative cooling is the process by which a body loses heat by thermal radiation. As Planck's law describes, every physical body spontaneously and continuously emits electromagnetic radiation.

Radiative cooling has been applied in various contexts throughout human history, including ice making in India and Iran, heat shields for spacecraft, and in architecture. In 2014, a scientific breakthrough in the use of photonic metamaterials made daytime radiative cooling possible. It has since been proposed as a strategy to mitigate local and global warming caused by greenhouse gas emissions known as passive daytime radiative cooling.

== Terrestrial radiative cooling ==
=== Mechanism ===
Infrared radiation can pass through dry, clear air in the wavelength range of 8–13 μm. Materials that can absorb energy and radiate it in those wavelengths exhibit a strong cooling effect. Materials that can also reflect 95% or more of sunlight in the 200 nanometres to 2.5 μm range can exhibit cooling even in direct sunlight.

=== Earth's energy budget ===
The Earth-atmosphere system is radiatively cooled, emitting long-wave (infrared) radiation which balances the absorption of short-wave (visible light) energy from the sun.

Convective transport of heat, and evaporative transport of latent heat are both important in removing heat from the surface and distributing it in the atmosphere. Pure radiative transport is more important higher up in the atmosphere. Diurnal and geographical variation further complicate the picture.

The large-scale circulation of the Earth's atmosphere is driven by the difference in absorbed solar radiation per square meter, as the sun heats the Earth more in the Tropics, mostly because of geometrical factors. The atmospheric and oceanic circulation redistributes some of this energy as sensible heat and latent heat partly via the mean flow and partly via eddies, known as cyclones in the atmosphere. Thus the tropics radiate less to space than they would if there were no circulation, and the poles radiate more; however in absolute terms the tropics radiate more energy to space.

=== Nocturnal surface cooling ===
Radiative cooling is commonly experienced on cloudless nights, when heat is radiated into outer space from Earth's surface, or from the skin of a human observer. The effect is well known among amateur astronomers.

The effect can be experienced by comparing skin temperature from looking straight up into a cloudless night sky for several seconds, to that after placing a sheet of paper between the face and the sky. Since outer space radiates at about a temperature of 3 K (−270.15 °C; −454.27 °F), and the sheet of paper radiates at about 300 K (27 °C; 80 °F) (around room temperature), the sheet of paper radiates more heat to the face than does the darkened cosmos. The effect is blunted by Earth's surrounding atmosphere, and particularly the water vapor it contains, so the apparent temperature of the sky is far warmer than outer space. The sheet does not block the cold, but instead reflects heat to the face and radiates the heat of the face that it just absorbed.

The same radiative cooling mechanism can cause frost or black ice to form on surfaces exposed to the clear night sky, even when the ambient temperature does not fall below freezing.

=== Kelvin's estimate of the Earth's age ===
The term radiative cooling is generally used for local processes, though the same principles apply to cooling over geological time, which was first used by Kelvin to estimate the age of the Earth (although his estimate ignored the substantial heat released by radioisotope decay, not known at the time, and the effects of convection in the mantle).

=== Astronomy ===
Radiative cooling is one of the few ways an object in space can give off energy. In particular, white dwarf stars are no longer generating energy by fusion or gravitational contraction, and have no solar wind. So the only way their temperature changes is by radiative cooling. This makes their temperature as a function of age very predictable, so by observing the temperature, astronomers can deduce the age of the star.

== Applications ==
=== Climate change ===
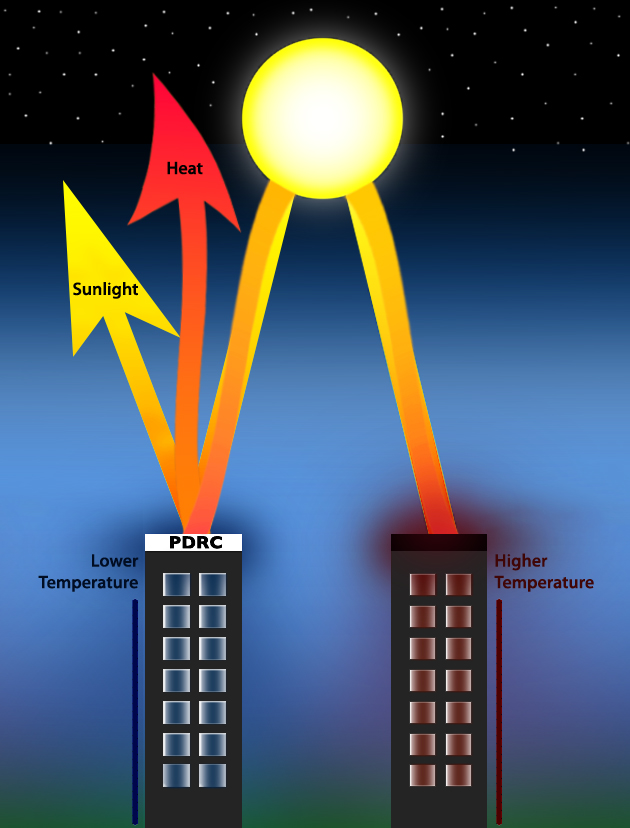
PDRC can lower temperatures with zero energy consumption or pollution by radiating heat into outer space. Widespread application has been proposed as a solution to global warming.

Passive daytime radiative cooling (PDRC)—also called passive radiative cooling, daytime passive radiative cooling, radiative sky cooling, photonic radiative cooling, and terrestrial radiative cooling—is the use of surfaces that are highly reflective and have high thermal emissivity to reduce the temperature of a building or other object.

It has been proposed as a method of reducing temperature increases caused by greenhouse gases by reducing the energy needed for air conditioning, reducing the urban heat island effect, and human body temperatures.

PDRC can aid systems that are more efficient at lower temperatures, such as photovoltaic systems, dew collection devices, and thermoelectric generators.

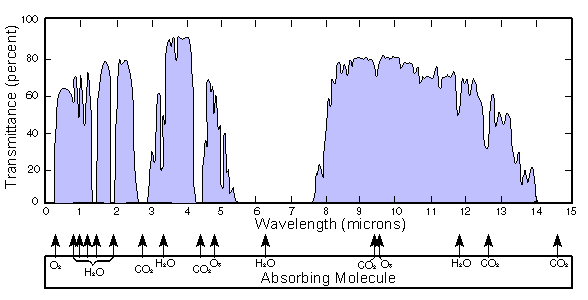
Passive radiative cooling technologies use the infrared window of 8–13 μm to radiate heat into outer space and impede solar absorption.

=== Architecture ===
Different roof materials absorb more or less heat. A higher roof albedo, or the whiter a roof, the higher its solar reflectance and heat emittance, which can reduce energy use and costs.

Cool roofs combine high solar reflectance with high infrared emittance, thereby simultaneously reducing heat gain from the sun and increasing heat removal through radiation. Radiative cooling thus offers potential for passive cooling for residential and commercial buildings. Traditional building surfaces, such as paint coatings, brick and concrete have high emittances of up to 0.96. They radiate heat into the sky to passively cool buildings at night. If made sufficiently reflective to sunlight, these materials can also achieve radiative cooling during the day.

Experimental studies have investigated the integration of daytime radiative cooling into building-scale systems using active hydronic configurations. A full-scale experimental campaign conducted in Arganda del Rey (Spain) evaluated a radiant-capacitive cooling system combining sky-exposed radiators, thermally active ceiling panels, and thermal energy storage within a closed-loop circuit. The system achieved average cooling potentials of up to 84.9 W/m² and indoor temperature reductions of up to 8.7 K relative to a control cell, while maintaining thermal comfort under ambient temperatures approaching 40 °C.

The most common radiative coolers found on buildings are white cool-roof paint coatings, which have solar reflectances of up to 0.94, and thermal emittances of up to 0.96. The solar reflectance of the paints arises from optical scattering by the dielectric pigments embedded in the polymer paint resin, while the thermal emittance arises from the polymer resin. However, because typical white pigments like titanium dioxide and zinc oxide absorb ultraviolet radiation, the solar reflectances of paints based on such pigments do not exceed 0.95.

In 2014, researchers developed the first daytime radiative cooler using a multi-layer thermal photonic structure that selectively emits long wavelength infrared radiation into space, and can achieve 5 °C sub-ambient cooling under direct sunlight. Later researchers developed paintable porous polymer coatings, whose pores scatter sunlight to give solar reflectance of 0.96-0.99 and thermal emittance of 0.97. In experiments under direct sunlight, the coatings achieve 6 °C sub-ambient temperatures and cooling powers of 96 W/m^{2}.

Other notable radiative cooling strategies include dielectric films on metal mirrors, and polymer or polymer composites on silver or aluminum films. Silvered polymer films with solar reflectances of 0.97 and thermal emittance of 0.96, which remain 11 °C cooler than commercial white paints under the mid-summer sun, were reported in 2015. Researchers explored designs with dielectric silicon dioxide or silicon carbide particles embedded in polymers that are translucent in the solar wavelengths and emissive in the infrared. In 2017, an example of this design with resonant polar silica microspheres randomly embedded in a polymeric matrix, was reported. The material is translucent to sunlight and has infrared emissivity of 0.93 in the infrared atmospheric transmission window. When backed with silver coating, the material achieved a midday radiative cooling power of 93 W/m^{2} under direct sunshine along with high-throughput, economical roll-to-roll manufacturing.

Daytime radiative cooling (DRC) extends these possibilities by enabling heat rejection even under direct sunlight, through surfaces that emit infrared radiation to the sky while reflecting solar radiation. This property has enabled the development of integrated hydronic cooling systems for buildings, in which outdoor sky radiators based on DRC surfaces cool a heat transfer fluid that circulates to ceiling-mounted radiant modules inside the building.

A transient numerical model validated with experimental data from a full-scale demonstrator, assessed for a single-family residential building in Madrid and Rome across a typical cooling season, showed seasonal energy performance improvements of +6.2% with a commercial DRC material and +10.3% with an ideal broadband emitter, compared to a system limited to nighttime radiative cooling. The system achieved seasonal energy efficiency ratios (SEER) up to 35 times higher than those of conventional air conditioning systems in the analysed cases, while maintaining indoor thermal comfort throughout the cooling season.

=== Heat shields ===
High emissivity coatings that facilitate radiative cooling may be used in reusable thermal protection systems (RTPS) in spacecraft and hypersonic aircraft. In such heat shields a high emissivity material, such as molybdenum disilicide (MoSi_{2}) is applied on a thermally insulating ceramic substrate. In such heat shields high levels of total emissivity, typically in the range 0.8 - 0.9, need to be maintained across a range of high temperatures. Planck's law dictates that at higher temperatures the radiative emission peak shifts to lower wavelengths (higher frequencies), influencing material selection as a function of operating temperature. In addition to effective radiative cooling, radiative thermal protection systems should provide damage tolerance and may incorporate self-healing functions through the formation of a viscous glass at high temperatures.

=== James Webb Space Telescope ===
The James Webb Space Telescope uses radiative cooling to reach its operation temperature of about 50 K. To do this, its large reflective sunshield blocks radiation from the Sun, Earth, and Moon. The telescope structure, kept permanently in shadow by the sunshield, then cools by radiation.

=== Nocturnal ice making in early India and Iran ===
Radiative cooling energy budget

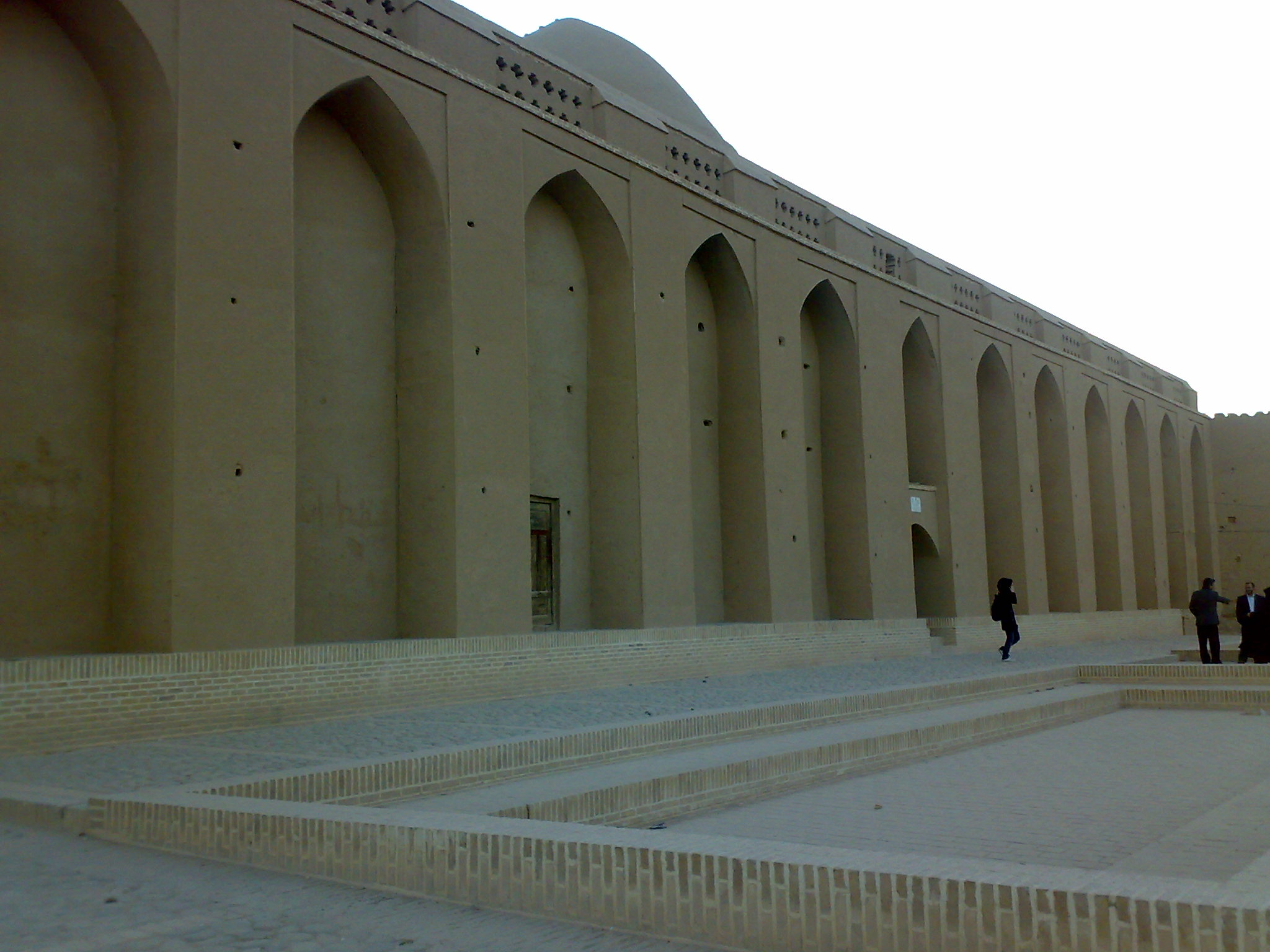
Ice Pool beside the Meybod yakhchāl in Iran

Before the invention of artificial refrigeration technology, ice making by nocturnal cooling was common in both India and Iran.

In India, such apparatuses consisted of a shallow ceramic tray with a thin layer of water, placed outdoors with a clear exposure to the night sky. The bottom and sides were insulated with a thick layer of hay. On a clear night the water would lose heat by radiation upwards. Provided the air was calm and not too far above freezing, heat gain from the surrounding air by convection was low enough to allow the water to freeze.

In Iran, this involved making large flat ice pools, which consisted of a reflection pool of water built on a bed of highly insulative material surrounded by high walls. The high walls provided protection against convective warming, the insulative material of the pool walls would protect against conductive heating from the ground, the large flat plane of water would then permit evaporative and radiative cooling to take place.

== Types ==
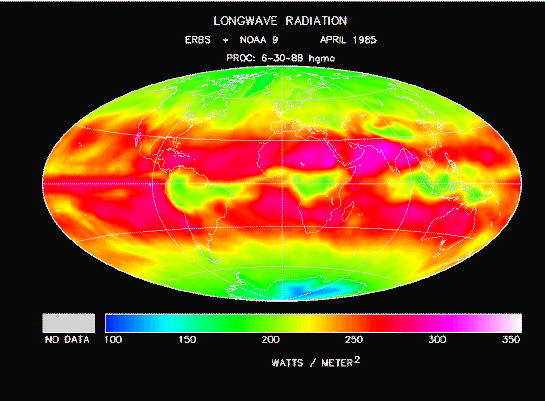
Earth's longwave thermal radiation intensity, from clouds, atmosphere and surface

The three basic types of radiant cooling are direct, indirect, and fluorescent:

- Direct radiant cooling - In a building designed to optimize direct radiation cooling, the building roof acts as a heat sink to absorb the daily internal loads. The roof acts as the best heat sink because it is the greatest surface exposed to the night sky. Radiate heat transfer with the night sky will remove heat from the building roof, thus cooling the building structure. Roof ponds are an example of this strategy. The roof pond design became popular with the development of the Sky thermal system designed by Harold Hay in 1977. There are various designs and configurations for the roof pond system but the concept is the same for all designs. The roof uses water, either plastic bags filled with water or an open pond, as the heat sink while a system of movable insulation panels regulate the mode of heating or cooling. During daytime in the summer, the water on the roof is protected from the solar radiation and ambient air temperature by movable insulation, which allows it to serve as a heat sink and absorb the heat generated inside through the ceiling. At night, the panels are retracted to allow nocturnal radiation between the roof pond and the night sky, thus removing the stored heat. In winter, the process is reversed so that the roof pond is allowed to absorb solar radiation during the day and release it during the night into the space below.
- Indirect radiant cooling - A heat transfer fluid removes heat from the building structure through radiate heat transfer with the night sky. A common design for this strategy involves a plenum between the building roof and the radiator surface. Air is drawn into the building through the plenum, cooled from the radiator, and cools the mass of the building structure. During the day, the building mass acts as a heat sink.
- Fluorescent radiant cooling - An object can be made fluorescent: it will then absorb light at some wavelengths, but radiate the energy away again at other, selected wavelengths. By selectively radiating heat in the infrared atmospheric window, a range of frequencies in which the atmosphere is unusually transparent, an object can effectively use outer space as a heat sink, and cool to well below ambient air temperature.

== See also ==
- Heat shield
- Optical solar reflector, used for thermal control of spacecraft
- Passive cooling
- Radiative forcing
- Stefan–Boltzmann law
- Terrestrial albedo effect
- Urban heat island
- Urban thermal plume
