= Human–animal hybrid =

Hypothetical organism

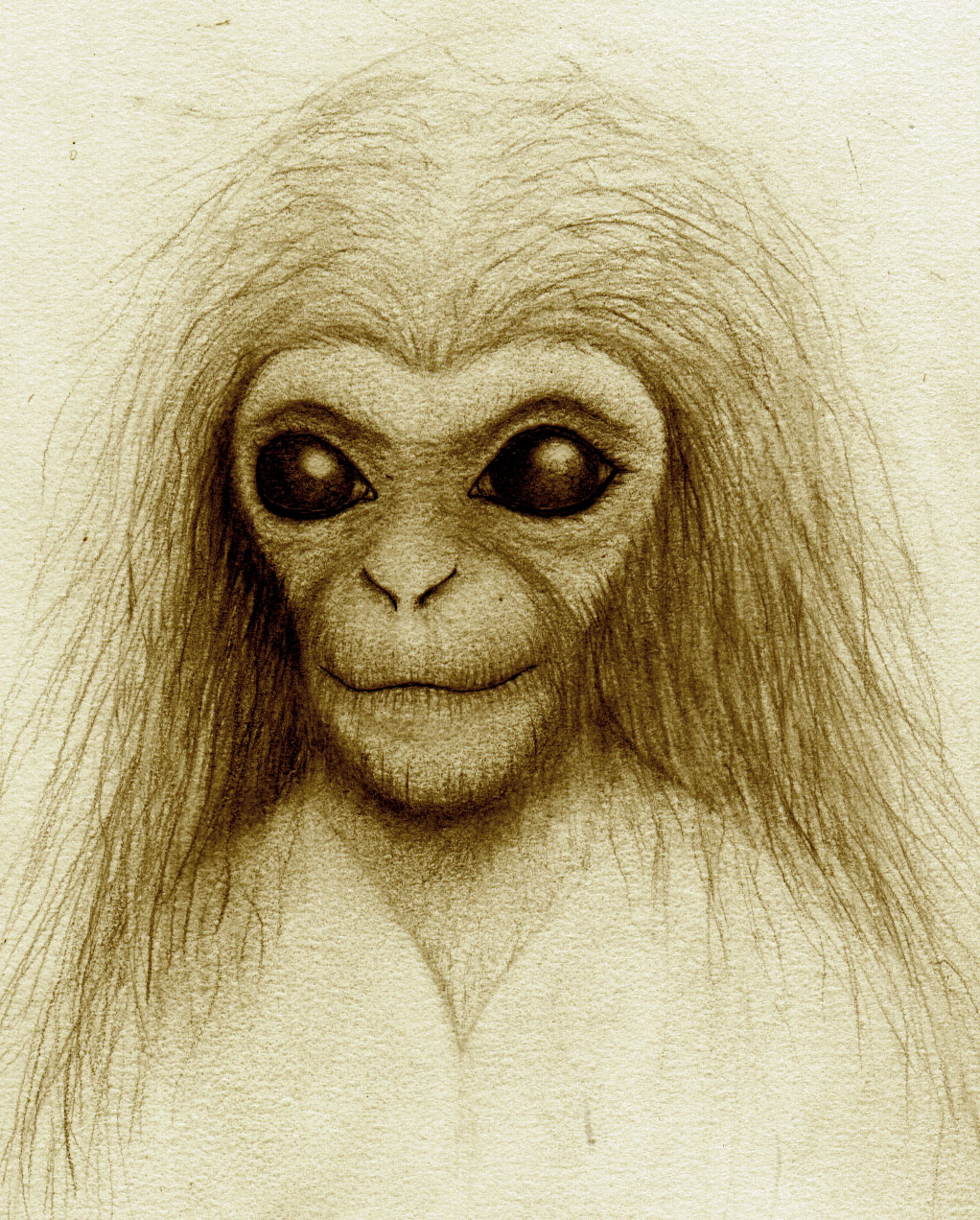
An artist's impression of a humanzee, or chimpanzee-human hybrid

A human–animal hybrid (or animal–human hybrid) is a hypothetical organism that incorporates elements from both humans and non-human animals. In a technical sense, a human–animal hybrid would be defined as an organism in which each cell contains both human and non-human genetic material. This contrasts with a non-human chimera in which some cells are human and the other are derived from a non-human organism. (A human chimera, by contrast, consists entirely of human cells from different zygotes.)

Examples of human–animal hybrids mainly include humanized mice that have been genetically modified by xenotransplantation of human genes. Humanized mice are commonly used as small animal models in biological and medical research for developing human therapeutics.

Human–animal hybrids are the subject of legal, moral and technological debate, particularly in light of recent advances in genetic engineering.

Human–animal hybrids have appeared in mythology and storytelling across multiple cultures and continents, and in recent decades in comic books, films, video games and other media.

== Terminology ==
Defined by the magazine H+, human–animal hybrids are "genetic alterations that are blendings [sic] of animal and human forms". Such hybrids may be referred to by other names occasionally such as "para-humans". They may additionally be called "humanized animals". Technically speaking, they are also related to "cybrids" (cytoplasmic hybrids), with "cybrid" cells featuring foreign human nuclei inside of them being a topic of interest. Possibly, a real-world human-animal hybrid may be an entity formed from either a human egg fertilized by a nonhuman sperm or a nonhuman egg fertilized by a human sperm.

== Examples ==
Artificially created human-animal hybrids include humanized mice that have been xenotransplanted with human gene products, so as to be utilized for gaining relevant insights in the in vivo context for understanding of human-specific physiology and pathology. Humanized mice are commonly used as small animal models in biological and medical research for human therapeutics including infectious diseases and cancer. For example, genetically modified mice may be born with human leukocyte antigen genes in order to provide a more realistic environment when introducing human white blood cells into them in order to study immune system responses.

== Moral discussions ==
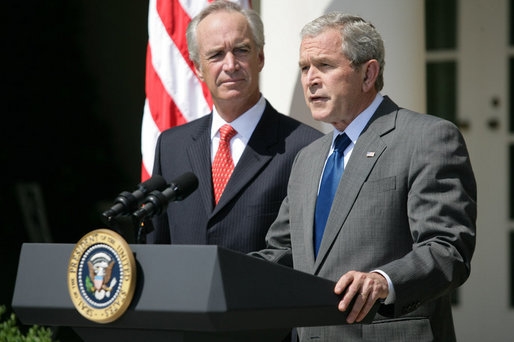
President George W. Bush, pictured here in 2008 with then Interior Secretary Dirk Kempthorne to his side, has advocated for increased regulation of genetic engineering, including on research mixing animal and human elements.

Advances in genetic engineering have generally caused a large number of debates and discussions in the fields related to bioethics, including research relating to the creation of human-animal hybrids. Although the two topics are not strictly related, the debates involving the creation of human-animal hybrids have paralleled those around the stem-cell research controversy.

The question of what line exists between a "human" being and a "non-human" being has been a difficult one for many researchers to answer. While animals having one percent or less of their cells originally coming from humans may clearly appear to be non-human, no consensus exists on how to categorise beings in a genetic middle ground that have an approximately even mix. "I don't think anyone knows in terms of crude percentages how to differentiate between humans and nonhumans," U.S. patent office official John Doll has stated. Critics of increased government restrictions include scientists such as Douglas Kniss, head of the Laboratory of Perinatal Research at Ohio State University, who has remarked that formal laws are not the best option since the "notion of animal-human hybrids is very complex."

In contrast, socio-economic theorist Jeremy Rifkin has expressed opposition to research that creates beings crossing species boundaries, arguing that it interferes with the fundamental 'right to exist' possessed by each animal species. "One doesn't have to be religious or into animal rights to think this doesn't make sense," he has argued when expressing support for anti-chimera and anti-hybrid legislation. As well, William Cheshire, associate professor of neurology at the Mayo Clinic's Florida branch, has called the issue "unexplored biologic territory" and advocated for a "moral threshold of human neural development" to restrict the destroying a human embryo to obtain cell material and/or the creation of an organism that's partly human and partly animal." He has said, "We must be cautious not to violate the integrity of humanity or of animal life over which we have a stewardship responsibility".

== Legality ==
While laws against the creation of hybrid beings have been proposed in U.S. states and in the U.S. Congress, several scientists have argued that legal barriers might go too far and prohibit medically beneficial studies into human modification.

In terms of scientific ethics, restrictions on the creation of human–animal hybrids have proved a controversial matter in multiple countries. While the state of Arizona banned the practice altogether in 2010, a proposal on the subject that sparked some interest in the United States Senate from 2011 to 2012 ended up going nowhere. Although the two concepts are not strictly related, discussions of experimentation into blended human and animal creatures has paralleled the discussions around embryonic stem-cell research (the 'stem cell controversy'). The creation of genetically modified organisms for a multitude of purposes has taken place in the modern world for decades, examples being specifically designed foodstuffs made to have features such as higher crop yields through better disease resistance.

President George W. Bush brought up the topic in his 2006 State of the Union Address, in which he called for the prohibition of "human cloning in all its forms", "creating or implanting embryos for experiments", "creating human-animal hybrids", and also "buying, selling, or patenting human embryos". He argued, "A hopeful society has institutions of science and medicine that do not cut ethical corners and that recognize the matchless value of every life." He also stated that humanity "should never be discarded, devalued or put up for sale."

A 2005 appropriations bill passed by the U.S. Congress and signed into law by President Bush contained specific wording forbidding any patents on humans or human embryos. In terms of outright bans on hybrid research in the first place, a measure came up in the 110th Congress entitled the Human-Animal Hybrid Prohibition Act of 2008. Congressman Chris Smith (R, NJ-4) introduced it on April 24, 2008. The text of the proposed act stated that "human dignity and the integrity of the human species are compromised" if such hybrids exist and set up the punishment of imprisonment for up to ten years as well as a fine of over one million dollars. Though attracting support from many co-sponsors such as then Representatives Mary Fallin, Duncan Hunter, Joseph R. Pitts, and Rick Renzi among others, the Act failed to get through Congress.

A related proposal had come up in the U.S. Senate the prior year, the Human-Animal Hybrid Prohibition Act of 2007, and it also had failed. That effort was proposed by then-Senator Sam Brownback (R, KS) on November 15, 2007. Featuring the same language as the later measure in the House, its bipartisan group of cosponsors included then Senators Tom Coburn, Jim DeMint, and Mary Landrieu.

A localized measure designed to ban the creation of hybrid entities came up in the state of Arizona in 2010. The proposal was signed into law by then Governor Jan Brewer. Its sponsor stated that it was needed to clarify important "ethical boundaries" in research.

== In myth ==
For thousands of years, these hybrids have been one of the most common themes in storytelling about animals throughout the world. The lack of a strong divide between humanity and animal nature in multiple traditional and ancient cultures has provided the underlying historical context for the popularity of tales where humans and animals have mingling relationships, such as in which one turns into the other or in which some mixed being goes through a journey. Interspecies friendships within the animal kingdom, as well as between humans and their pets, additionally provides an underlying root for the popularity of such beings.

In various mythologies throughout history, many particularly famous hybrids have existed, including as a part of Egyptian and Indian spirituality. The entities have also been characters in fictional media such as in H. G. Wells' work The Island of Doctor Moreau, adapted into the popular 1932 film Island of Lost Souls. In legendary terms, the hybrids have played varying roles from that of trickster and/or villain to serving as divine heroes in very different contexts, depending on the given culture.

=== Legendary historical and mythological human-animal hybrids ===
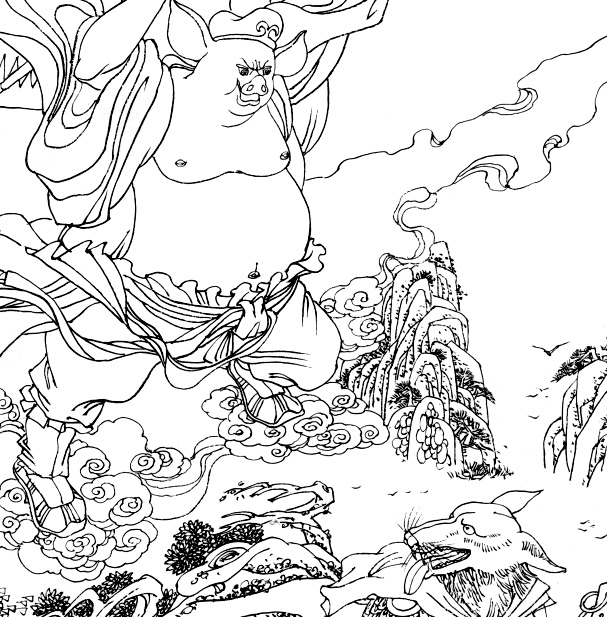
The pig-like hybrid being Zhu Bajie, pictured in this piece of fan art, plays a major role in the famous Ming dynasty era religious novel Journey to the West.

Beings displaying a mixture of human and animal traits while also having a similarly blended appearance have played a vast and varied role in multiple traditions around the world. Artist and scholar Pietro Gaietto has written that "representations of human-animal hybrids always have their origins in religion". In "successive traditions they may change in meaning but they still remain within spiritual culture", Gaietto has argued, when looking back in an evolution-minded point of view. The beings show up in both Greek and Roman mythology, with various elements of ancient Egyptian society ebbing and flowing into those cultures in particular. Prominent examples in ancient Egyptian religion, featuring some of the earliest such hybrid beings, include the canine-like god of death known as Anubis and the lion-like Sphinx. Other instances of these types of characters include figures within both Chinese and Japanese mythology. The observation of interspecies friendships within the animal kingdom, as well as the bonds existing between humans and their pets, have been a source of the appeal in such stories.

A prominent hybrid figure that's internationally known is the mythological Greek figure of Pan. A deity that rules over and symbolizes the untamed wild, he helps express the inherent beauty of the natural world as the Greeks saw things. He specifically received reverence by ancient hunters, fishermen, shepherds, and other groups with a close connection to nature. Pan is a Satyr who possesses the hindquarters, legs, and horns of a goat while otherwise being essentially human in appearance; stories of his encounters with different gods, humans, and others have been a part of popular culture in several different cultures for many years. The human-animal hybrid has appeared in acclaimed works of art by figures such as Francis Bacon, also being mentioned in poetic pieces such as in John Fletcher's writings. Additional famous mythological hybrids include the Egyptian god of death, named Anubis, and the fox-like Japanese beings that are called Kitsune.

In Chinese mythology, the figure of Zhu Bajie (Chinese: 豬八戒; pinyin: Zhūbājiè) undergoes a personal journey in which he gives up wickedness for virtue. After causing a disturbance in heaven from his licentious actions, he is exiled to Earth. By mistake, he enters the womb of a sow and ends up being born as a half-man/half-pig entity. With the head and ears of a pig coupled with a human body, his already animal-like sense of selfishness from his past life remains. Killing and eating his mother as well as devouring his brothers, he makes his way to a mountain hideout, spending his days preying on unwary travelers unlucky enough to cross his path. However, the exhortations of the kind goddess Kuan Yin, journeying in China, persuade him to seek a nobler path, and his life's journey and the side of goodness proceeds on such that he is even ordained a priest by the goddess herself. Remarking on the character's role in the religious novel Journey to the West, where the being first appears, professor Victor H. Mair has commented that "[p]ig-human hybrids represent descent and the grotesque, a capitulation to the basest appetites" rather than "self-improvement".

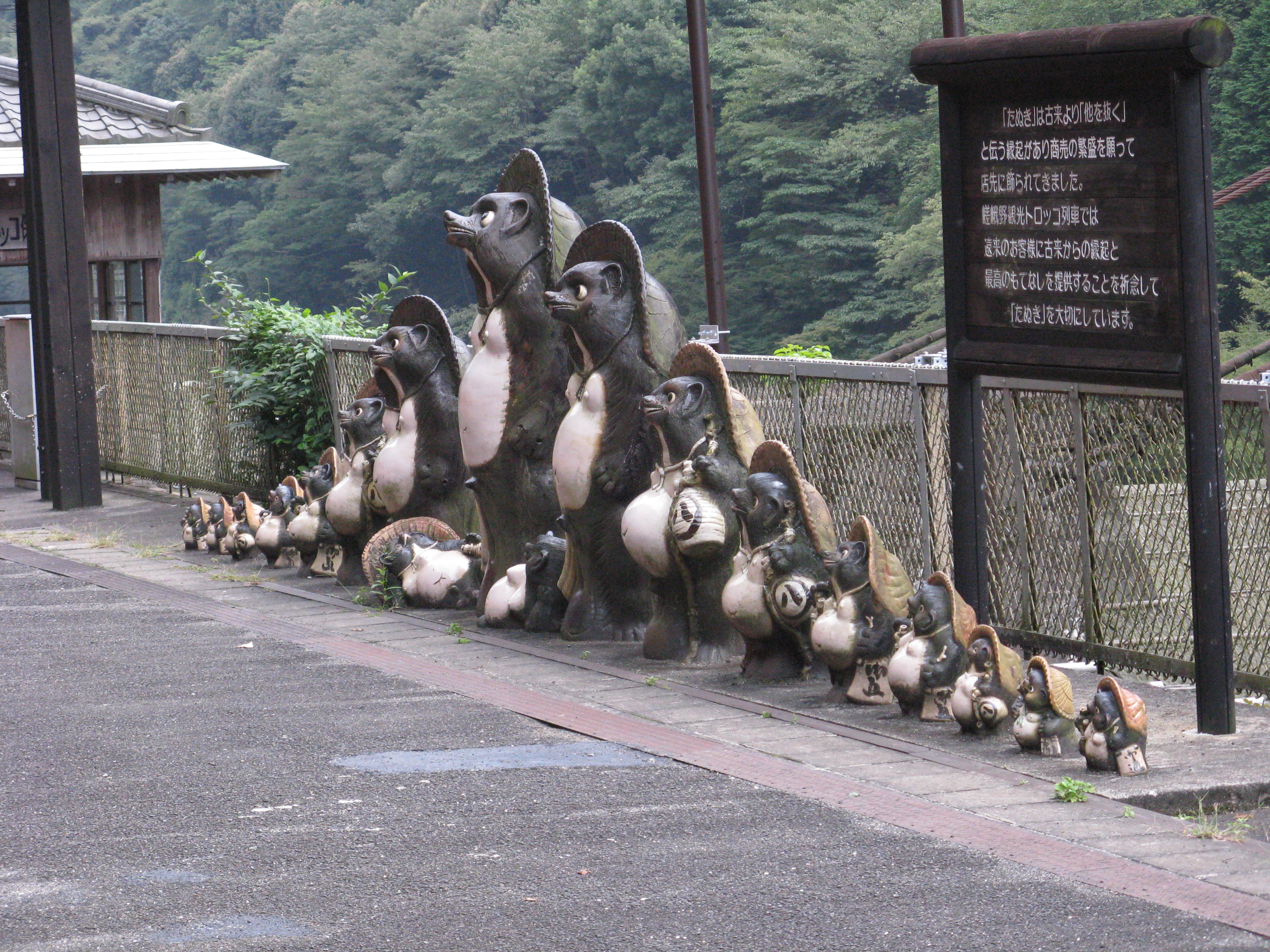
This image depicts a set of Tanuki statues on the side of a Japanese road.

Several hybrid entities have long played a major role in Japanese media and in traditional beliefs within the country. For example, a warrior god known as Amida received worship as a part of Japanese mythology for many years; he possessed a generally humanoid appearance while having a canine-like head. However, the god's devotional popularity fell in about the middle of the 19th century. A Tanuki resembles a raccoon dog, but its shape-shifting talents allow it to turn into humans for the purposes of trickery, such as impersonating Buddhist monks. The fox-like creatures known as Kitsune also possess similar powers, and stories abound of them tricking human men into marriage by turning into seductive women.

Other examples include characters in ancient Anatolia and Mesopotamia. The latter region has had the tradition of a malevolent human-animal hybrid deity in Pazuzu, the demon featuring a humanoid shape yet having grotesque features such as sharp talons. The character picked up revived attention when an interpretation of it appeared in William Peter Blatty's 1971 novel The Exorcist and the Academy Award winning 1973 film adaption of the same name, with the demon possessing the body of an innocent young girl. The movie, regarded as one of the greatest horror films of all time, has a prologue in which co-protagonist Father Merrin (Max von Sydow) visits an archaeological dig in Iraq and ominously discovers an old statue of the monstrous being.

==== Theriocephaly studies ====
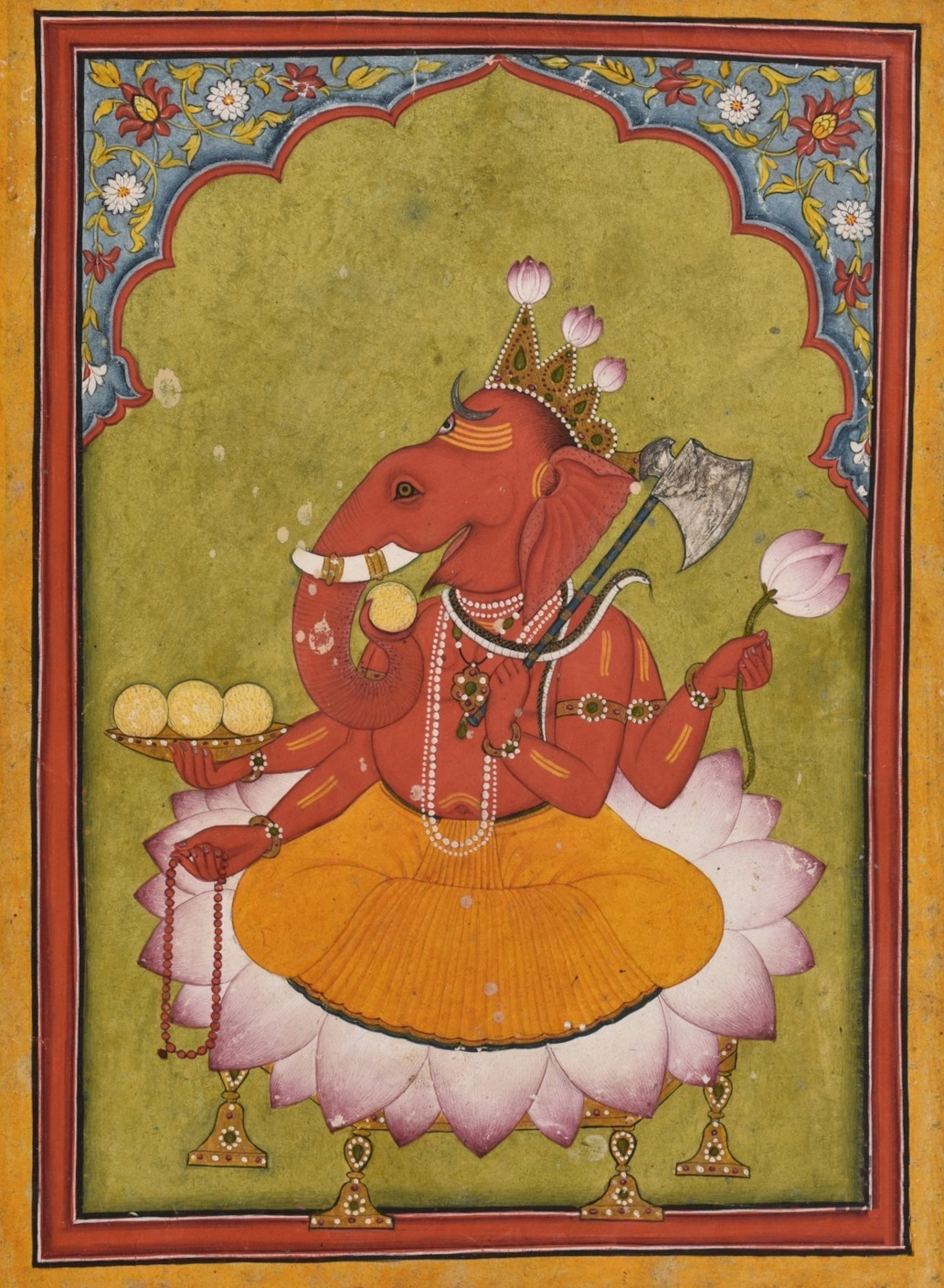
Ganesha, who has an elephant's head, is one of the most revered entities in the Hindu pantheon.

"Theriocephaly" (from Greek θηρίον therion 'beast' and κεφαλή kefalí 'head') is the anthropomorphic condition or quality of having the head of an animal with a body either mostly or entirely looking human – the term being commonly used to refer the depiction of deities or otherwise specially able individuals. An entity with such qualities is said to be "theriomorphous". Many of the gods and goddesses worshipped by the ancient Egyptians, for example, were commonly depicted as being theriocephalic. This phenomenon partly represented an intermediate step in a longer process of anthropomorphization of former animal deities (e.g. the goddess Hathor in her earliest form was depicted as a cow and in her latest manifestation as a woman with cows ears and sometimes a hairstyle resembling cows horns). But the form of depiction sometimes depended also on the aspects of a deity an artist wanted to accentuate (e.g. Ba, the aspect of personality of a human soul, was depicted as a bird with a human's head). This can also be seen in the different hieroglyphs that could be used to write the name of a single deity.

Other notable examples include:

- Thoth (One of the most creative deities of the ancient Egyptian pantheon, Thoth was the god of the moon, medicine, science, magic, judgement, and writing. One of the most popular of all Egyptian gods. The hieroglyphs within the walls of the Giza Pyramids indicate that Thoth created the earth, the moon and the stars etc.
- Horus features the head of a falcon.
- Anubis has a jackal's head.
- Set, often depicted with the head of an unknown creature, gets associated with a being referred to as the "Set animal" by Egyptologists.
- Khonsu (god of the moon disc), depicted as a man with a falcon's head and/or as a human child, both with a moon disc on top of the head.

Examples from other geographic areas include:

- Cernunnos, a historic Celtic deity, has been adapted as the Horned God in Wicca tradition.
- The Minotaur menaces people in Greek mythology.
- In some Eastern Orthodox Church icon traditions, some saints, particularly St. Christopher, get depicted as having the head of a dog.
- In Hinduism, Ganesha features an elephant head.
- In Abenaki mythology, a part of the history of the indigenous peoples of the United States, the spirit Pamola was a being who possessed the head of a moose as well as the wings and feet of an eagle.

== In fiction ==
=== Literature ===
Many prominent pieces of children's literature over the past two centuries have featured humanized animal characters, often as protagonists in the stores. In the opinion of popular educator Lucy Sprague Mitchell, the appeal of such mythical and fantastic beings comes from how children desire "direct" language "told in terms of images— visual, auditory, tactile, muscle images". Another author has remarked that an "animal costume" provides "a way to emphasize or even exaggerate a particular characteristic".

The anthropomorphic characters in the seminal works by English writer Beatrix Potter in particular live an ambiguous situation, having human dress yet displaying many instinctive animal traits. Writing on the popularity of Peter Rabbit, a later author commented that in "balancing humanized domesticity against wild rabbit foraging, Potter subverted parental authority and its built in hypocrisy" in Potter's child-centered books. Writer Lisa Fraustino has cited on the subject R.M. Lockley's tongue-in-cheek observation: "Rabbits are so human. Or is it the other way around— humans are so rabbit?"

Writer H. G. Wells created his famous work The Island of Doctor Moreau, featuring a mixture of horror and science fiction elements, to promote the anti-vivisection cause as a part of his long-time advocacy for animal rights. Wells' story describes a man stuck on an island ruled over by the titular Dr. Moreau, a morally depraved scientist who has created several human-animal hybrids referred to as 'Beast Folk' through vivisection and even by combining parts of other animals for some of the 'Beast Folk'. The story has been adapted into film several times, with varying success. The most acclaimed version is the 1932 black-and-white treatment called Island of Lost Souls. Wells himself wrote that "this story was the response of an imaginative mind to the reminder that humanity is but animal rough-hewn to a reasonable shape and in perpetual internal conflict between instinct and injunction," with the scandals surrounding Oscar Wilde being the impetus for the English writer's treatment of themes such as ethics and psychology. Challenging the Victorian era viewpoints of its time, the 1896 work presents a complex situation in which enhancing animals into hybrids involves both terrifying violence and pain as well as appears essentially futile, given the power of raw instinct. A pessimistic view towards the ability of human civilization to live by law-abiding, moral standards for long thus follows.

In Franz Kafka's The Metamorphosis, Gregor Samsa "transforms into an Ungeziefer (loosely, ‘vermin’), a symbolic human-animal hybrid––a supercharged synanthrope—co-inhabiting human flesh, mind, and room."

=== Television ===
On a more everyday life tone, featuring human-animal hybrids of mythological beings having common human experiences, A Centaur's Life, known in Japan as Centaur's Worries (Japanese: セントールの悩み, Hepburn: Sentōru no Nayami), is a Japanese slice of life comedy manga series by Kei Murayama. The series has been serialized in Tokuma Shoten's Monthly Comic Ryū magazine since February 2011, and is published in English by Seven Seas Entertainment. An anime television series adaptation by Haoliners Animation League aired in Japan from July to September 2017.

=== Films ===
The 1986 horror film The Fly features a deformed and monstrous human-fly hybrid, played by actor Jeff Goldblum. His character, scientist Seth Brundle, undergoes a teleportation experiment that goes awry and fuses him at a fundamental genetic level with a common fly caught besides him. Brundle experiences drastic mutations as a result that horrify him. Movie critic Gerardo Valero has written that the famous horror work, "released at the dawn of the AIDS epidemic", "was seen by many as a metaphor for the disease" while also playing on bodily fears about dismemberment and coming apart that human beings inherently share.

The H. P. Lovecraft–inspired movie Dagon, released in 2001, additionally features grotesque hybrid beings.

Heroic character examples of human-animal anthropomorphic characters include the two protagonists of the 2002 movie The Cat Returns (Japanese title: 猫の恩返し), with the animated film featuring a young girl (named "Haru") being transformed against her will into a feline-human hybrid and fighting a villainous king of the cats with the help of a dashing male cat companion (known as the "Baron") at her side.

The science fiction film Splice, released 2009, shows scientists mixing together human and animal DNA in the hopes of advancing medical research at the pharmaceutical company that they work at. Calamitous results occur when the hybrid named Dren (portrayed by Delphine Chanéac) is born.

=== Comic books ===
In terms of comic books, examples of fictional human-animal hybrids include the characters in Charles Burns' Black Hole series. In those comics, a set of teenagers in a 1970s era town become afflicted by a bizarre disease; the sexually transmitted affliction mutates them into monstrous forms.

Marvel Comics has a race of human-animal hybrids called the New Men who were created by the High Evolutionary by evolving the animals into humanoid forms.

=== Video games ===
Multiple video games have featured human-animal hybrids as enemies for the protagonist(s) to defeat, including powerful boss characters. For instance, the 2014 survival horror release The Evil Within includes grotesque hybrid beings, looking like the undead, attacking main character Detective Sebastian Castellanos. With partners Joseph Oda and Julie Kidman, the protagonist attempts investigate a multiple homicide at a mental hospital yet discovers a mysterious figure who turns the world around them into a living nightmare, Castellanos having to find the truth about the criminal psychopath.

=== Furry fandom ===
The furry fandom consists of individuals interested in a variety of artistic materials and media, often featuring art depicting human-animal hybrids in everyday life. The majority of people involved in the fandom have a unique fursona depicting a version or versions of themselves as a hybrid creature. This practice functions as an outlet based on "personal ideas of self-expression" (self-realization) or belonging in the community.

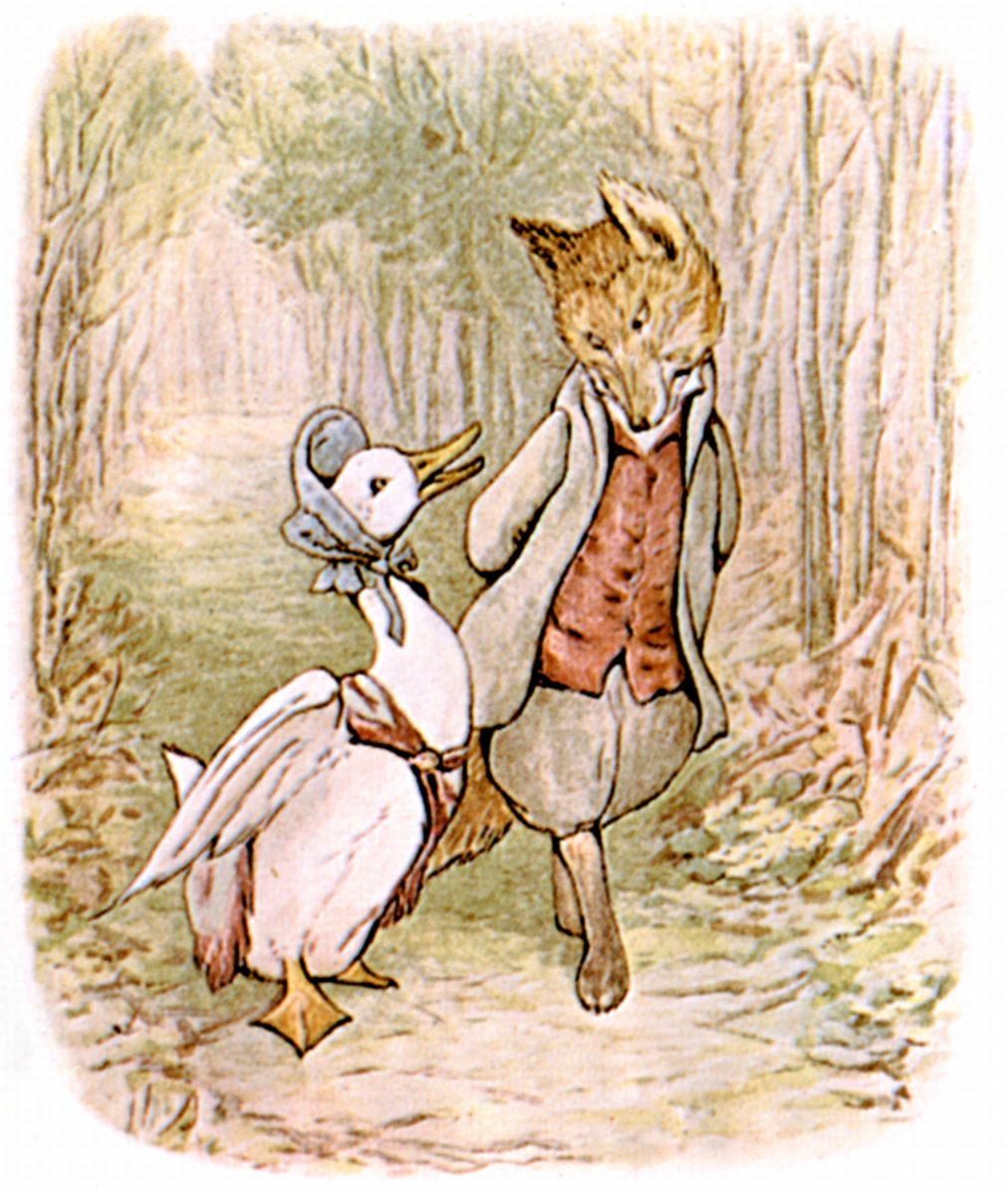
The Tale of Jemima Puddle-Duck, a work written and illustrated by Beatrix Potter, features a spirited humanized animal as the title character.

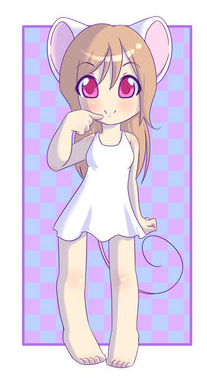
The kemonomimi art style, widely popularized since the latter part of the 20th century, involves humanoid characters with stylized animal features, such as this anthropomorphic mouse girl.

== See also ==
- Animacy
- Alyoshenka
- Anthropomorphism
- Bestiality
- Biopunk
- Catgirl
- Chimera
- Furry fandom
- Gene therapy
- Genetic engineering
- Human–animal bonding
- Human–animal communication
- Human–animal studies
- Human enhancement
- Humanized mice
- Humanoid
- Humanzee
- Humster
- Hybrid
- Hybrid beasts in folklore
- Interspecies friendships
- Interspecific pregnancy
- Kemonomimi
- Legendary creature
- List of hybrid creatures in mythology
- Mary Toft
- Mythic animal
- Mythic humanoids
- Mythological hybrid
- Nephilim
- Otherkin
- Posthuman
- Talking animal
- Shapeshifting
- Theriocephaly
- Transhumanism
- Trial of Thomas Hogg
