= C7.GAT protein =

Zinc finger protein

The C7.GAT protein is a zinc finger protein based on the C7 protein (itself based on the murine Zif268). It features an alternative zinc finger 3 alpha helix sequence, preventing the target site overlap caused by the aspartic acid residue of the finger 3 of C7. The sequence of this third finger is TSG-N-LVR according to the single letter amino acid code. As the name suggest, the target site of finger 3 is altered to 5'-GAT-3', giving the overall protein a target of 5'-GCGTGGGAT-3'.

C7.GAT is used in studies investigating the effects of altering zinc finger alpha helix sequence on the target of the altered zinc finger, as well as the affinity and specificity of these proteins to their targets.
