= OSR1 =

Protein-coding gene in the species Homo sapiens

Identifiers
- Aliases: OSR1, ODD, odd-skipped related transcription factor 1, odd-skipped related transciption factor 1
- External IDs: OMIM: 608891; MGI: 1344424; GeneCards: OSR1

Gene location (Human)
Chr.	Chromosome 2 (human)
Band	2p24.1	Start	19,351,485 bp
Band	2p24.1	End	19,358,623 bp

Gene location (Mouse)
Chr.	Chromosome 12 (mouse)
Band	12 A1.1|12 4.05 cM	Start	9,620,116 bp
Band	12 A1.1|12 4.05 cM	End	9,631,500 bp
RNA expression pattern
Bgee	Human / Mouse (ortholog); Top expressed in: Descending thoracic aorta; ascending aorta; popliteal artery; tibial arteries; right coronary artery; minor salivary glands; left coronary artery; gastric mucosa; muscle layer of sigmoid colon; urinary bladder / Top expressed in: ascending aorta; intermediate mesoderm; phalanx of second toe; aortic valve; body wall; internal carotid artery; lower lip; upper lip; genital tubercle; dermis; More reference expression data
BioGPS	n/a
Gene ontology
Molecular function	metal ion binding; nucleic acid binding; protein serine/threonine kinase activity; protein binding; protein kinase binding; DNA-binding transcription factor activity, RNA polymerase II-specific; RNA polymerase II transcription regulatory region sequence-specific DNA binding
Cellular component	nucleus; cytosol; extrinsic component of membrane
Biological process	pronephros development; cellular response to retinoic acid; metanephric glomerulus vasculature development; roof of mouth development; cell differentiation; specification of posterior mesonephric tubule identity; ureteric bud development; specification of anterior mesonephric tubule identity; regulation of transcription, DNA-templated; chondrocyte differentiation; negative regulation of nephron tubule epithelial cell differentiation; positive regulation of gastrulation; embryonic skeletal joint development; metanephric cap mesenchymal cell proliferation involved in metanephros development; positive regulation of bone mineralization; positive regulation of epithelial cell proliferation; embryonic skeletal limb joint morphogenesis; metanephric mesenchymal cell differentiation; posterior mesonephric tubule development; intermediate mesoderm development; embryonic digit morphogenesis; metanephric epithelium development; negative regulation of apoptotic process; negative regulation of transcription by RNA polymerase II; mesonephric duct morphogenesis; transcription, DNA-templated; stem cell differentiation; odontogenesis; mesonephros development; cell proliferation involved in kidney development; development of the heart; metanephric nephron tubule development; ureter urothelium development; positive regulation of gene expression; mesangial cell development; pattern specification involved in metanephros development; metanephric smooth muscle tissue development; renal vesicle progenitor cell differentiation; middle ear morphogenesis; embryonic skeletal joint morphogenesis; urogenital system development; metanephric mesenchyme morphogenesis; metanephros development; negative regulation of epithelial cell differentiation; metanephric interstitial fibroblast development; gonad development; embryonic forelimb morphogenesis; metanephric mesenchyme development; positive regulation of transcription by RNA polymerase II; embryonic hindlimb morphogenesis; osmosensory signaling pathway; peptidyl-threonine phosphorylation; negative regulation of creatine transmembrane transporter activity; negative regulation of sodium ion transmembrane transporter activity
Sources:Amigo / QuickGO
Orthologs
Databases	NCBI: entry; OMA: entry
Species	Human	Mouse
Entrez	130497	23967
Ensembl	ENSG00000143867	ENSMUSG00000048387
UniProt	Q8TAX0	Q9WVG7
RefSeq (mRNA)	NM_145260	NM_011859
RefSeq (protein)	NP_660303	NP_035989
Location (UCSC)	Chr 2: 19.35 – 19.36 Mb	Chr 12: 9.62 – 9.63 Mb
PubMed search
- Wikidata
View/Edit Human	View/Edit Mouse

Protein odd-skipped-related 1 is a transcription factor that in humans is encoded by the OSR1 gene. The OSR1 and OSR2 transcription factors participate in the normal development of body parts such as the kidney.

Protein odd-skipped related 1 is a zinc-finger transcription factor that, in humans, is encoded by the OSR1 gene found on chromosome 2 (2p24.1) and in mice is encoded by the Osr1 gene. In mammals, OSR1 is involved in the development of the kidneys, heart and in the palate and is often coexpressed with OSR2. OSR1 and OSR2 are homologous to the Odd-skipped class transcription factors in Drosophila, encoded by odd, bowl, sob and arm.

== Structure ==
OSR1 is a 266 amino-acid protein and contains three C_{2}H_{2} zinc finger domains. OSR1 and OSR2 share 65% amino-acid sequence and 98% zinc finger domain similarity.

== Function ==
=== Early expression ===
In mice, during gastrulation on embryological day 7.5, cells fated to become intermediate mesoderm show the mouse OSR1 homologue, Osr1, expression. A day later, it is expressed in the intermediate mesoderm, lateral to the neural plate. Osr1 expression weakens and shifts posteriorly, to the presumptive kidneys, by day 9.5. By day 10.5, the branchial arch and limbs also begin to express Osr1.

=== Heart development ===
Mice carrying a targeted null mutation in the Odd1 gene show that Odd1 is essential for heart and intermediate mesoderm development.Osr1 regulates atrial septum formation in the heart. Osr1 is expressed in the dorsal atrial wall, from which the primary atrial septum will emerge, and later in the septum and left venous valve leaflet. It is also present in the mesothelium of the thoracic cavity and the parietal pericardium. Embryos lacking Osr1 expression usually die before birth due to deformed atrioventricular junctions and hypoplastic venous valves; the ones that progress to term also have an incomplete parietal pericardium. These pathologies occur in the presence of other transcription factors important for atrial septum formation such as Nkx2.5, Pitx2 and Tbx5. Deleting Osr1 in second heart field demonstrated absence of the atrial septum. It is also demonstrated that Osr1 is a direct downstream target of Tbx5 in the second heart field and establish a Tbx5-Osr1 pathway parallel to Hh signaling required for atrial septation. Osr1 can also interact with Tbx5 to regulate posterior second heart field cell cycle progression for cardiac septation.

=== Kidney development ===
Osr1 is the earliest marker of the intermediate mesoderm, which will form the gonads and kidneys. This expression is not essential for the formation of intermediate mesoderm but for the differentiation towards renal and gonadal structures. Osr1 acts upstream of and causes expression of the transcription factors Lhx1, Pax2 and Wt1 which are involved in early urogenital development. In normal kidney development, activation of the Pax2-Eya1-Hox11 complex and subsequent activation of Six2 and Gdnf expression allows for branching of the ureteric bud and maintenance of the nephron-forming cap mesenchyme. Six2 maintains the self-renewing state of the cap mesenchyme. and Gdnf, via the Gdnf-Ret signalling pathway, is required for attraction and branching of the growing ureteric bud. Within the developing kidney, Osr1 expressing cells will become mesangial cells, pericytes, ureteric smooth muscle and the kidney capsule. The cell types that Osr1 expressing cells will differentiate into are determined by the timing of loss of expression – cells that will become part of the vasculature or ureteric epithelium lose expression of Osr1 early (E8.5), and those that become nephrons lose expression later (E11.5). All three stages of kidney formation are affected in mice lacking Osr1 expression and are similar to mice with reduced Wt1 and Pax2 expression – the Wollfian duct is abnormal, there are fewer mesonephric tubules and the kidney-forming metanephros and gonads are missing. In embryonic day 10.5, embryos lacking Osr1 expression fail to grow a ureteric bud that migrates into the uncompacted metanephric mesenchyme. The lack of inductive signals from the ureteric bud combined with a downstream reduction in Pax2 expression results in apoptosis and agenesis of the kidney.

=== Limb formation ===
Expression of Osr1 in the limb buds is initially restricted to the mesenchyme immediately below the endoderm, but shifts anteriorly and proximally by embryonic day 11.5. In mice, Osr1 is expressed in the interdigital mesenchyme and presumptive synovial joints during limb development. where it overlaps with expression of Gdf5, an early marker for joint formation. Mouse embryonic limb muscle connective tissue cells express the transcription factor Osr1, differentiating into fibrogenic and adipogenic cells in vivo and in vitro and defining a population of embryonic fibro-adipogenic progenitors (FAPs) like population. Genetic lineage tracing shows that developmental Osr1+ cells give rise to a subset of adult FAPs. Loss of Osr1 function leads to a reduction of myogenic progenitor proliferation and survival resulting in limb muscle patterning defects.

=== Cancer ===
The expression of OSR1 is more reduced in lung cancer tissues than in normal lung tissues, and was correlated with poor differentiation. OSR1 could downregulate the activity of the Wnt signaling pathway by suppressing the expression of SOX9 and β‐catenin. OSR1 expression is also significantly down-regulated at both mRNA and protein levels in primary gastric cancer tissues compared with adjacent normal tissues. It acts as a functional tumour suppressor through the transcriptional activation of p53 and repression of TCF/LEF in gastric cancer. OSR1 expression was downregulated in primary RCC and negatively correlated with histological grade. Downregulation of OSR1 might represent a potentially prognostic marker and therapeutic target for RCC.

=== Other sites ===
Osr1 is expressed in the first and second branchial arches, in the limb buds, mouth and nasal pits, in the trunk, the forebrain., developing somites, distal mandible and developing eye.

== Regulation ==
The expression of Osr1 is negatively regulated by Runx2 and Ikzf1. These genes are involved in osteoblast and lymphocyte differentiation through their interaction with the Osr1 promoter region. In human osteoblast and osteosarcoma cell lines, OSR1 is directly induced by 1,25-dihydroxyvitamin D_{3}.

== Clinical relevance ==
=== Reduction of kidney size caused by variant allele ===
A variant human OSR1 allele which does not produce a functional transcript and found in 6% of Caucasian populations, reduces the size of the newborn kidney by 11.8%.

=== OSR1 methylation in cancer ===
OSR1 is methylated and downregulated in 51.8% of gastric cancer cells and tissues. When expressed normally, OSR1 is anti-proliferative – it induces cell cycle arrest and induces apoptosis in gastric cancer cell. OSR1 is methylated in above 85% of squamous cell carcinomas.

== Orthologs ==
OSR1 orthologs in model organisms
Organism	Gene	Function
Chick	cOsr1	Expressed in intermediate and lateral plate mesoderm, developing sinus venosus of the heart, maxillary and mandibular processes, developing eye and limbs.
Xenopus frog	XOsr	Expressed in the intermediate mesoderm and required in pronephros formation.
Danio rerio Zebrafish	zOsr	Pronephros formation. Reduced zOsr expression results in reduced expression of kidney epithelial sodium-glucose cotransporter and sodium-potassium-chlorine cotransporter genes.
D.melanogaster Drosophila	odd, bowl, sob	expressed in seven stripes at the blastoderm stage, then during gastrulation the seven primary stripes are supplemented by secondary stripes which appear in alternate segments. This results in the labelling of every segment in the extended germ band. Also expressed in the embryo in distinct regions of the gut, the Garland cells associated with the proventriculus, the pericardial cells, the lymph glands associated with the heart, in a subset of cells in the central nervous system and in select apodemes. Expressed in a segmentally repeated pattern in the leg disk at the distal edge of each presumptive leg segment except in tarsal segments 1 to 4.
Caenorhabditis elegans	odd-1, odd-2	Is an ortholog of human OSR1 (odd-skipped related transcription factor 1) and OSR2 (odd-skipped related transcription factor 2). Is predicted to have RNA polymerase II regulatory region sequence-specific DNA binding activity. Is expressed in intestine.

== See also ==
OSR2 (gene)
