= Zinc finger transcription factor =

Transcription factor

Zinc finger transcription factors or ZF-TFs, are transcription factors composed of a zinc finger-binding domain and any of a variety of transcription-factor effector-domains that exert their modulatory effect in the vicinity of any sequence to which the protein domain binds.

Besides the presence of additional domains that regulate their activity, such as the predominantly found KRAB domains, the mechanism by which zinc finger transcription factors activate transcription remains unknown. Recently, it was shown that a complex called Zincore, Zinc finger co-regulator, can bind directly to the DNA-binding domain of zinc finger proteins, shedding light on how zinc finger transcription factors can activate transcription.

Zinc finger protein transcription factors can be encoded by genes small enough to fit a number of such genes into a single vector, allowing the medical intervention and control of expression of multiple genes and the initiation of an elaborate cascade of events. In this respect, it is also possible to target a sequence that is common to multiple (usually functionally related) genes to control the transcription of all these genes with a single transcription factor. Additionally, a group of related genes can be targeted by modulating the expression of the endogenous transcription factor(s) that regulate them. They also have the advantage that the targeted sequence need not be symmetrical unlike most other DNA-binding motifs based on natural transcription factors that bind as dimers.

== Applications ==
By targeting the ZF-TF toward a specific DNA sequence and attaching the necessary effector domain, it is possible to downregulate or upregulate the expression of the gene(s) in question while using the same DNA-binding domain. The expression of a gene can also be downregulated by blocking elongation by RNA polymerase (without the need for an effector domain) in the coding region or RNA itself can also be targeted. In addition to their clear role in advancing gene function research, engineered ZF-TFs also hold therapeutic potential, including the ability to correct abnormal gene expression profiles (e.g., erbB-2 overexpression in human adenocarcinomas) and anti-retrovirals (e.g. HIV-1).

Thalidomide analogs, in combination with the E3 ligase Cereblon (CRBN), represent a new class of potential therapeutics for selectively degrading C2H2 zinc finger transcription factors. These compounds enable CRBN to bind multiple zinc finger proteins and promote their ubiquitination and proteasomal degradation, offering a strategy to target transcription factors previously considered 'undruggable'.

== See also ==
- Artificial transcription factor, of which the ZF-TF is a type
- Gene therapy
- Zinc finger proteins
- Zinc finger chimera
- Zinc finger nuclease
