= Protein odd-skipped-related 2 =

Protein-coding gene in the species Homo sapiens

OSR2

Identifiers
- Aliases: OSR2, odd-skipped related transciption factor 2
- External IDs: OMIM: 611297; MGI: 1930813; GeneCards: OSR2
Available structures
| PDB | Ortholog search: PDBe RCSB |
| PDB | List of PDB id codes 2EE8 |

Gene location (Human)
| Chr. | Chromosome 8 (human) |
| Band | 8q22.2 | Start | 98,944,403 bp |
| Band | 8q22.2 | End | 98,952,104 bp |

Gene location (Mouse)
| Chr. | Chromosome 15 (mouse) |
| Band | 15 B3.1|15 14.46 cM | Start | 35,296,244 bp |
| Band | 15 B3.1|15 14.46 cM | End | 35,303,451 bp |
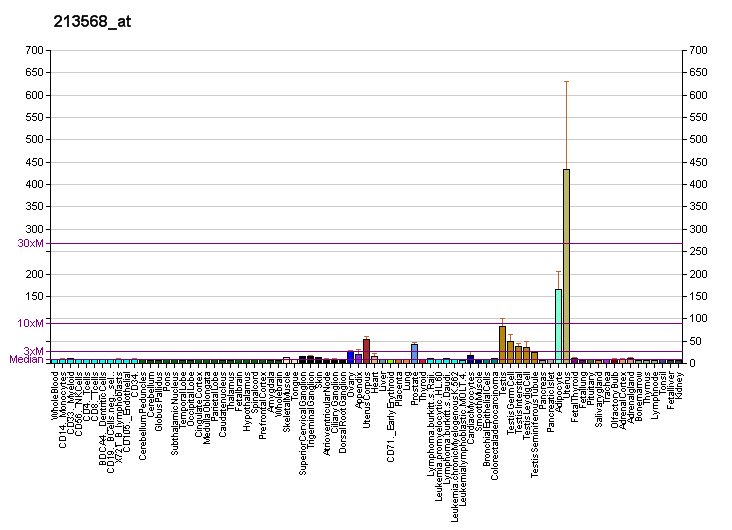
RNA expression pattern
| Bgee | Human / Mouse (ortholog); Top expressed in: palpebral conjunctiva; body of uterus; canal of the cervix; left uterine tube; seminal vesicula; right ovary; urethra; decidua; ectocervix; right uterine tube / Top expressed in: genital tubercle; female external genitalia; uterus; paramesonephric duct; ileum; intestinal villus; vas deferens; eyelid; right kidney; jejunum; More reference expression data |
| BioGPS | More reference expression data |
Gene ontology
| Molecular function | metal ion binding; protein binding; nucleic acid binding; sequence-specific DNA binding; DNA-binding transcription factor activity, RNA polymerase II-specific; RNA polymerase II transcription regulatory region sequence-specific DNA binding |
| Cellular component | nucleus |
| Biological process | negative regulation of transcription by RNA polymerase II; metanephros development; mesonephros development; chondrocyte differentiation; positive regulation of cell population proliferation; positive regulation of gene expression; cell differentiation; positive regulation of bone mineralization; osteoblast proliferation; embryonic forelimb morphogenesis; embryonic hindlimb morphogenesis; embryonic skeletal limb joint morphogenesis; middle ear morphogenesis; odontogenesis; embryonic digit morphogenesis; positive regulation of transcription, DNA-templated; positive regulation of transcription by RNA polymerase II; embryonic skeletal system morphogenesis; positive regulation of epithelial cell proliferation; roof of mouth development; embryonic skeletal joint morphogenesis; head development; bone morphogenesis; eyelid development in camera-type eye; embryonic skeletal joint development; embryo development ending in birth or egg hatching; urogenital system development |
Sources:Amigo / QuickGO
Orthologs
| Databases | NCBI: entry; OMA: entry |
| Species | Human | Mouse |
| Entrez | 116039 | 107587 |
| Ensembl | ENSG00000164920 | ENSMUSG00000022330 |
| UniProt | Q8N2R0 | Q91ZD1 |
| RefSeq (mRNA) | NM_001142462; NM_001286841; NM_053001; NM_001394683 | NM_054049; NM_001368665 |
| RefSeq (protein) | NP_001135934; NP_001273770; NP_443727 | NP_473390; NP_001355594 |
| Location (UCSC) | Chr 8: 98.94 – 98.95 Mb | Chr 15: 35.3 – 35.3 Mb |
| PubMed search |
- Wikidata
| View/Edit Human | View/Edit Mouse |

Protein odd-skipped-related 2 is a protein that in humans is encoded by the OSR2 gene. In mice, it is involved in the development of the palate and in suppressing the formation of teeth after the eruption of adult teeth.

== See also ==
- OSR1
