= Optical solar reflector =

Spacecraft component

An optical solar reflector (OSR) is a component of a vehicle or machine designed to fly in outer space. The reflector consists of a top layer made out of quartz, over a reflecting layer made of metal. OSRs are used for radiators on spacecraft.

The quartz outer layer lets the solar light through which reflects on the metal layer. This results in a low absorption coefficient. The quartz layer is a good IR emitter. The result of these properties is a good emitting, low absorbing material, thus making it a cold material.

OSRs are often used in Geostationary orbits, where high radiation levels would cause other thermal surface coatings to rapidly degrade. This is due to the fact that the vast majority of geostationary orbits lie in the Van Allen Radiation Belt.

Optical solar reflectors are a type of second surface mirror.

== See also ==
- Radiative cooling
- Spacecraft components
