= Urban thermal plume =

An urban thermal plume describes rising air in the lower altitudes of the Earth's atmosphere caused by urban areas being warmer than surrounding areas. Over the past thirty years there has been increasing interest in what have been called urban heat islands (UHI), but it is only since 2007 that thought has been given to the rising columns of warm air, or ‘thermal plumes’ that they produce. Common on-shore breezes at the seaside on a warm day, and off-shore breezes at night are caused by the land heating up faster on a sunny day and cooling faster after sunset, respectively. Thermals, or warm air, that rise from the land and sea affect the local microscale meteorology; and perhaps at times the mesometeorology. Urban thermal plumes have as powerful although less localized an effect.

London is generally 3 to 9 Celsius hotter than the Home Counties. London’s meteorological aberrations were first studied by Luke Howard, FRS in the 1810s, but the notion that this large warm area would produce a significant urban thermal plume was not seriously proposed until very recently.

Microscale thermal plumes, whose diameters may be measured in tens of metres, such as those produced by industrial chimney stacks, have been extensively investigated, but largely from the point of view of the plumes dispersal by local micrometeorology. Though their velocity is generally less, their very much greater magnitude (diameter) means that urban thermal plumes will have a more significant effect upon the mesometeorology and even continental macrometeorology.

== Climate change ==
Decreasing Arctic sea ice cover is one of the most visible manifestations of climate change, often linked to rising global temperatures. However, there are several reports that shrinking polar ice is due more to changes in ambient wind direction than to increasing environmental temperatures per se.

In 2006-07, a team led by Son Nghiem of NASA Jet Propulsion Laboratory, Pasadena, California, studied trends in Arctic perennial ice cover by combining data from NASA's QuikSCAT satellite, which can identify and map different classes of sea ice, including older, thicker perennial ice and younger, thinner seasonal ice. The scientists observed that the Arctic Ocean was dominated by thinner seasonal ice that melts faster. This ice is more easily compressed and responds more quickly to being pushed out of the Arctic by winds. Those thinner seasonal ice conditions facilitated the ice loss, leading to this 2007’s record low amount of total Arctic sea ice. Nghiem concluded that the rapid decline in winter perennial ice the past two years was caused by unusual wind patterns that compressed the sea ice, loaded it into the Transpolar Drift Stream and then sped its flow out of the Arctic, where it rapidly melted in the warmer waters at lower latitudes.

It has been severally reported that in a stratified atmosphere cross-stream exchange occurs above the planetary boundary layer when there is a vertical motion of significant moment. While recognising that the steady lessening of vertical motion towards the edges of urban thermal plumes will have an ameliorating effect, Rail proposed that such urban thermal plumes play a critical part in producing the changes in ambient wind direction over the Arctic and have had a direct impact on Arctic shrink. The impact of urban thermal plumes will vary depending on a large variety of factors including the diameter and temperature gradient of the Urban heat island, the latitude, the thermal stability of the stratiform, and the synoptic wind. Thus, for example, urban thermal plumes will have far greater impact at higher latitudes (above 40°N and above 40°S), where the Earth-atmosphere system undergoes net cooling by radiation.

== See also ==
- Global warming
