= C7 protein =

Engineered zinc finger protein

C7 protein is an engineered zinc finger protein based on the murine ZFP, Zif268 and discovered by Wu et al. in 1994 (published in 1995). It shares the same zinc finger 2 and zinc finger 3 of Zif268, but differs in the sequence of finger 1. It also shares the same DNA target, 5'-GCGTGGGCG-3'.

The shared sequences in single letter amino acid codes of fingers 2 and 3 are RSD-H-LTT and RAD-E-RKR (positions -1 through 6 in the alpha helix).

Zinc finger 1 has the sequence KSA-D-LKR which provides a 13-fold increase in affinity to the target sequence of the entire ZFP over that of Zif268.

It is used in zinc finger investigations in which the amino acid sequence of finger 2 is changed in order to determine the appropriate sequence to target a given three-nucleotide target site. A variation of C7, C7.GAT is preferred since it lacks the aspartic acid residue present in finger 3 of C7 and known to cause a phenomenon called 'target site overlap'. In this case the target site overlap is a result of the aspartic acid residue forming a hydrogen bond with the N4 of the cytosine (in the opposite strand) base-paired to the guanine in the finger 2 subsite. It can also form the same hydrogen bond with an adenine base paired to a thymine. This target site overlap would dictate that either a cytosine or adenine residue be present as the 3' nucleotide in the finger 2 subsite which is unacceptable when looking to target sequences containing another nucleotide at this position.
