= Target-site overlap =

In a zinc finger protein, certain sequences of amino acid residues are able to recognise and bind to an extended target-site of four or even five nucleotides When this occurs in a ZFP in which the three-nucleotide subsites are contiguous, one zinc finger interferes with the target-site of the zinc finger adjacent to it, a situation known as target-site overlap. For example, a zinc finger containing arginine at position -1 and aspartic acid at position 2 along its alpha-helix will recognise an extended sequence of four nucleotides of the sequence 5'-NNG(G/T)-3'. The hydrogen bond between Asp^{2} and the N4 of either a cytosine or adenine base paired to the guanine or thymine, respectively defines these two nucleotides at the 3' position, defining a sequence that overlaps into the subsite of any zinc finger that may be attached N-terminally.

Target-site overlap limits the modularity of those zinc fingers which exhibit it, by restricting the number of situations to which they can be applied. If some of the zinc fingers are restricted in this way, then a larger repertoire is required to address the situations in which those zinc fingers cannot be used. Target-site overlap may also affect the selection of zinc fingers by display, in cases where amino acids on a non-randomised finger, and the bases of its associated subsite, influence the binding of residues on the adjacent finger which contains the randomised residues. Indeed, attempts to derive zinc finger proteins targeting the 5'-(A/T)NN-3' family of sequences by site-directed mutagenesis of finger two of the C7 protein were unsuccessful due to the Asp^{2} of the third finger of said protein.

The extent to which target-site overlap occurs is largely unknown, with a variety of amino acids having shown involvement in such interactions. When interpreting the zinc finger repertoires presented by investigations using ZFP phage display, it is important to appreciate the effects that the rest of the zinc finger framework may have had in these selections. Since the problem only appears to occur in a limited number of cases, the issue is nullified in most situations in which there are a variety of suitable targets to choose from and only becomes a real issue if binding to a specific DNA sequence is required (e.g. blocking binding by endogenous DNA-binding proteins).

== See also ==
- Zinc finger chimera
- Zinc finger protein
