= PComb3H =

pComb3H, a derivative of pComb3 optimized for expression of human fragments, is a phagemid used to express proteins such as zinc finger proteins and antibody fragments on phage pili for the purpose of phage display selection.

For the purpose of phage production, it contains the bacterial ampicillin resistance gene (for B-lactamase), allowing the growth of only transformed bacteria.
