= HT-TALENS =

HT-TALENS (HIV-targeted transcription activator-like effector nucleases) is an engineered plant protein that is a proposed cure for AIDS.

== AIDS ==
The HIV genome is made from RNA rather than DNA. The enzyme that converts RNA to DNA and then inserts it into a cell makes between one and 10 mistakes every time it copies itself. This high error rate means that the virus population that inhabits each HIV patients is genetically diverse.

When the HIV virus infects someone, it copies its DNA and inserts into the DNA of white blood cells, making the virus part of its host. Even if these genes could be silenced with drugs, (later) stopping the drugs sets the viral DNA free to attack the patient.

HT-TALENs binds to that sequence and cuts the HIV DNA, but not human DNA. When that cut gets fixed by the cell's DNA repair system, it makes a scar that leaves the virus unable to return and make HIV DNA cells. 60% of the cells making the protein damage the viral DNA.

== See also ==
- TALENs
