= Gisèle Sapiro =

French sociologist and historian (born 1965)

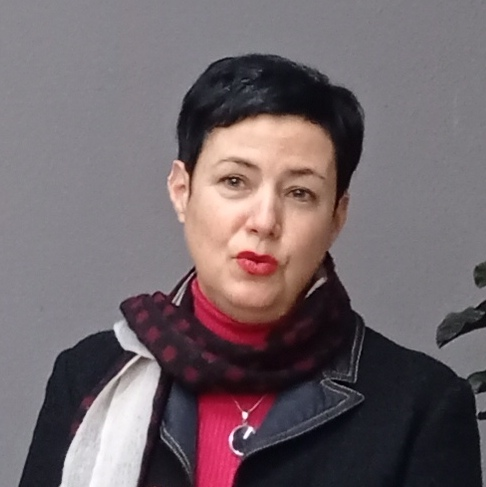
- Gisèle Sapiro in 2021
- Born: June 22, 1965 (age 61); Neuilly-sur-Seine, France
- Occupations: sociologist; historian
- Writing career
- Subjects: 19th and 20th century French literature
- Notable awards: CNRS Silver Medal (2021); CNRS Bronze Medal (2000)

Gisèle Sapiro (Neuilly-sur-Seine, June 22, 1965) is a French sociologist and historian whose specialty area is 19th and 20th century French literature. She is a laureate of the CNRS Silver Medal (2021) and the CNRS Bronze Medal (2000).

== Career and research ==
Gisèle Sapiro's research focuses on the intellectual field, the international circulation of works and ideas, particularly with regard to writers and literature. A research director at the French National Centre for Scientific Research (CNRS), where she received the bronze medal in 2000, she has been a director of studies at the École des hautes études en sciences sociales (EHESS) since 2011, and a member of the Centre de sociologie européenne (CSE), which became the European Centre for Sociology and Political Science (CESSP), which Sapiro directed from 2010 to 2013. Her work is a continuation of Pierre Bourdieu's work. Currently she is consulting editor of the Journal of the History of Ideas.

In several books, she has questioned the notion of the writer's responsibility. In her essay "Les écrivains et la politique en France" (Writers and Politics in France), published in 2018, Sapiro studies the role of the writer in French society, stating that contemporary literature is a place of social and political criticism.

== Awards and honours ==
- 2021: CNRS Silver Medal
- 2000: CNRS Bronze Medal

== Selected works ==
- La Guerre des écrivains, 1940–1953 [The Writers' War, 1940–1953] (in French). Paris: Fayard. 1999. ISBN 2-213-60211-5.
- Translation. Le marché de la traduction en France à l'heure de la mondialisation [Translation. The translation market in France in the era of globalization]. Paris: Éditions du CNRS. 2009.
- Les Contradictions de la globalisation éditoriale [The Contradictions of Editorial Globalization]. Paris: Éditions Nouveau Monde. 2009.
- L'Espace intellectuel en Europe : de la formation des États-nations à la mondialisation, XIX–XXI siècle [Intellectual Space in Europe: From the Formation of Nation-States to Globalization, 19th–21st centuries] (in French). Paris: Éditions La Découverte. 2009. ISBN 978-2-7071-5780-5.
- La Responsabilité de l'écrivain. Littérature, droit et morale en France, XIX–XXI siècle (The Responsibility of the Writer. Literature, Law and Morality in France, 19th–21st Century), Éditions du Seuil, Paris, 2011
- La Sociologie de la littérature (The Sociology of Literature), Paris, Éditions La Découverte, 2014, ISBN 9782707165749
- Les Écrivains et la politique en France : de l'Affaire Dreyfus à la guerre d'Algérie (Writers and Politics in France: from the Dreyfus Affair to the Algerian War), Paris, Seuil, 2018
- Des mots qui tuent. La responsabilité de l'intellectuel en temps de crise, 1944–1945 (Words that Kill. The Responsibility of the Intellectual in Times of Crisis, 1944–1945), Paris, Seuil, Points, 2020
- Peut-on dissocier l'œuvre de l'auteur ? (Can we separate the work from the author?), Paris, Seuil, 2020

=== Articles ===
- « Le négationnisme en France » (Holocaust denial in France), Revue de synthèse, vol. 125, 5th series, 2004, p. 217–228; reprinted in Pierre Vidal-Naquet, Les Assassins de la mémoire, augmented edition, Paris, La Découverte, 2005, p. 209–225
- « Traduction et globalisation des échanges : le cas du français » (Translation and globalization of exchanges: the case of French), in Jean-Yves Mollier (ed.), Où va le livre ? (Where is the book going?), Paris, La Dispute, 2007, chap. X
- Sapiro, Gisèle (2010). "Punir la violence des mots : les procès des intellectuels français au sortir de la deuxième guerre mondiale" [Punishing the violence of words: the trials of French intellectuals after the Second World War]. L'Esprit créateur. 50 (4): 4–19. doi:10.1353/esp.2010.a407012. JSTOR 26289675.
