= HIV-associated cardiomyopathy =

- Specialty: Cardiology

Heart problems are more common in people with HIV/AIDS. Those with left ventricular dysfunction have a median survival of 101 days as compared to 472 days in people with AIDS with healthy hearts. HIV is a major cause of cardiomyopathy (problems with the heart muscle that reduce the efficiency with which the heart pumps blood). The most common type of HIV induced cardiomyopathy is dilated cardiomyopathy also known as eccentric ventricular hypertrophy which leads to impaired contraction of the ventricles due to volume overload. The annual incidence of HIV associated dilated cardiomyopathy was 15.9/1000 before the introduction of highly active antiretroviral therapy (HAART). However, in 2014, a study found that 17.6% of HIV patients have dilated cardiomyopathy (176/1000) meaning the incidence has greatly increased.

== Presentation ==
Signs and symptoms such as malabsorption and diarrhea respectively, may occur with HIV infection causing many HIV patients to have nutritional deficiencies and altered levels of vitamin B12, carnitine, and growth and thyroid hormones - all have been associated with left ventricular dysfunction. A lowered BMI in HIV patients is also associated with cardiomyopathy.

== Cause ==
Dilated cardiomyopathy can be due to pericardial effusion or infective endocarditis, especially in intravenous drug users which are common in the HIV population. However, the most researched cause of cardiomyopathy is myocarditis (myocardial inflammation and infection) caused by HIV-1, which the main subtype of HIV (the other being HIV-2), with greater likelihood of transmission and shorter period between infection and illness. HIV-1 virions infect cardiomyocytes in patches but there is no direct correlation between viral infection and dysfunction of cardiomyocytes. HIV-related cardiomyopathy is often not associated with any specific opportunistic infection, and approximately 40% of patients have not experienced any opportunistic infection before the onset of cardiac symptoms.

=== Myocarditis ===
Myocarditis has been documented at autopsy in 40–52% of patients who died of AIDS before the introduction of HAART. Toxoplasma gondii is the most common opportunistic infectious agent associated with myocarditis in AIDS occurring in 12% of deaths from AIDS 1987-1991 in one autopsy series. Myocardial toxoplasmosis causes an increase in the myocardial fraction of creatine kinase (CK-MB). In situ hybridization or polymerase chain reaction studies illustrate a high frequency of cytomegalovirus and HIV-1 in AIDS patients with lymphocytic myocarditis and severe left ventricular dysfunction. Thus, it supports the hypothesis that HIV-1 has a pathogenetic action and influences dilated cardiomyopathy. Coinfection with viruses (usually, coxsackievirus B3 and cytomegalovirus) seems to have an important effect as the GISCA autopsy records show that 83% of patients with myocarditis and 50% with dilated cardiomyopathy were coinfected with viruses.

=== Myocardial cytokine expression ===
HIV-1 invades the myocardium through endothelial cells by micropinocytosis infecting perivascular macrophages which produce additional virus and cytokines such as tumour necrosis factor-α (TNF-α). This induces cardiomyocyte apoptosis either by signalling through CCR3, CCR5 or CXCR4, by entry into cardiomyocytes (after binding to ganglioside GM1), or through TNF-α. In addition, HIV-1-associated protein gp 120 may induce apoptosis through a mitochondrion-controlled pathway after activating inflammatory cytokines. TNF-α is produced by infected macrophages and the interaction between dendritic cells presenting the antigen to CD8 (T Killer cells). It causes a negative inotropic effect by interfering with the intracellular calcium ion concentrations perhaps by inducing the synthesis of nitric oxide (NO), also decreasing contractility. The intensity of the stains for TNF-α and inducible nitric oxide synthase (iNOS) of the myocardium was greater in patients with HIV associated cardiomyopathy (as opposed to idiopathic cardiomyopathy), myocardial viral infection and was inversely correlated with CD4 count with antiretroviral therapy having no effect.

=== Autoimmune cardiomyopathy ===
Cardiac autoimmunity affects the pathogenesis of HIV-related heart disease as HIV-infected patients with dilated cardiomyopathy are more likely to have cardiac-specific autoantibodies (anti-α-myosin autoantibodies) than HIV-infected patients with healthy hearts and HIV-negative controls. In addition, patients with echocardiographic evidence of left ventricular dysfunction had a higher chance of having cardiac autoantibodies. Furthermore, impaired myocardial growth and left ventricular dysfunction may be immunologically mediated as monthly intravenous immunoglobulins (IVIG) in HIV-infected children reduces left ventricular dysfunction, increases left ventricular wall thickness, and reduces peak left ventricular wall stress. Perhaps this is because immunoglobulins inhibit the cardiac autoantibodies by competing for Fc receptors. Alternatively, the immunoglobulins can reduce the effects or secretions of cytokines and cellular growth factors.

=== Encephalopathy ===
HIV-infected patients with encephalopathy are more likely to die of congestive heart failure than are those without encephalopathy; the hazard ratio is 3.4. Cardiomyopathy and encephalopathy are hypothesised to be linked by the HIV reservoir cells which are in the myocardium and cerebral cortex and keep HIV-1 on their surfaces for long periods of time even after receiving HAART. They also secrete TNF-α, interleukin-6 (IL-6) and endothelin-1 which are cytotoxic cytokines causing tissue damage.

=== Drug cardiotoxicity ===
Zidovudine is an example of a nucleoside analogue and has been shown to cause: myocarditis and dilated cardiomyopathy as well as an increase in total cholesterol, triglycerides, LDL, HDL and insulin resistance. Protease inhibitors are another group of drugs (e.g. ritonavir) and some of them can cause a range of problems such as: lipodystrophy, atherosclerosis, increase total cholesterol, triglyceride, HDL, LDL, and insulin resistance. Amphotericin B can cause dilated cardiomyopathy, hypertension and bradycardia whereas, Ganciclovir can cause ventricular tachycardia. Interferon-alpha can cause arrhythmia and myocardial infarction/ischemia.

== Treatment ==
Mortality in HIV-infected patients with cardiomyopathy is increased independently of CD4 count, age, sex, and HIV risk group. The therapy is similar to therapy for non-ischemic cardiomyopathy: after medical therapy is begun, serial echocardiographic studies should be performed at 4-months intervals. If function continues to worsen or the clinical course deteriorates, a biopsy should be considered. HAART has reduced the incidence of myocarditis thus reducing the prevalence of HIV-associated cardiomyopathy by about 30% in developed countries. However, the prevalence in developing countries is 32% and increasing as HAART is scarce – not to mention the effects of other risk factors such as high cholesterol and lipid diet. IVIGs can also help patients with HIV-associated myocarditis as mentioned earlier.
