= Ludovic Ferrière =

French researcher (born 1982)

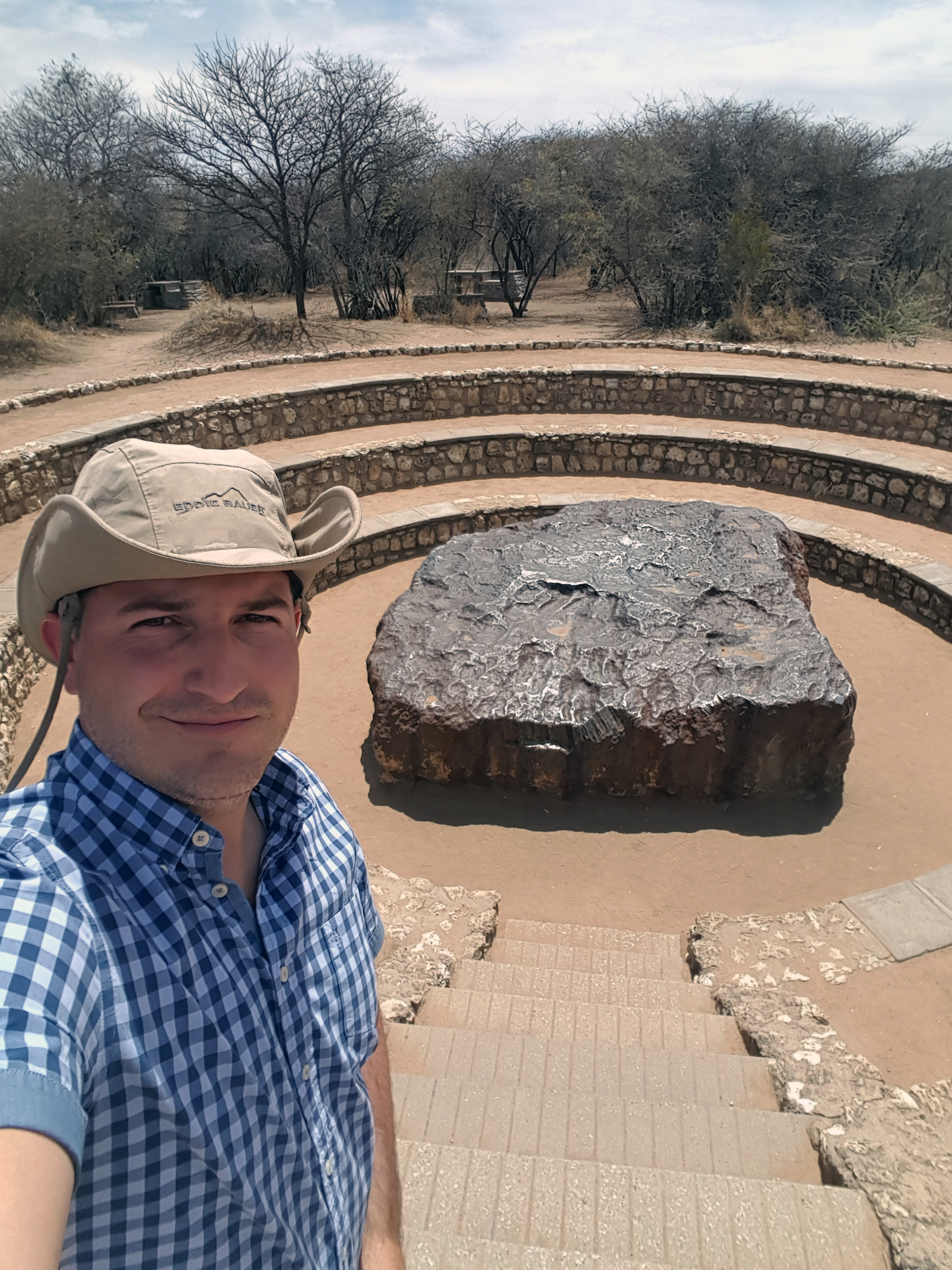
- Ludovic Ferrière and the Hoba meteorite in Namibia (2019)
- Born: 21 October 1982 (age 44); Blois, France
- Education: University of Vienna
- Known for: Impact research
- Scientific career
- Workplaces: Naturhistorisches Museum
- Thesis: Shock metamorphism and geochemistry of impactites from the Bosumtwi impact structure: A case study of shock-induced deformations and transformations in quartz and associated methodology (2009)

Ludovic Ferrière (born October 21, 1982) is a French geologist, former curator of the meteorite collection and of the impactite collection at the Natural History Museum, Vienna, Austria, and current Curator of Geology and Meteorites at the Natural History Museum Abu Dhabi. He is known for his research on meteorite impact craters.

== Early life and career ==
Born in Blois on October 21, 1982, Ferrière developed an early interest in rocks and minerals. At the University of Tours (France), his passion for meteorite impact cratering was really born, so he spent a year at the University Laval (Quebec, Canada) to study geology and explore nearby craters during his spare time. Returning to France he did a one-year course on Planetology at the University of Nantes. Then, he completed a Master in Planetology at the Pierre and Marie Curie University in Paris (France), and learnt about meteorites at the Museum of Natural History. He finally completed his PhD thesis in Vienna (Austria) in 2009, on the geological and geochemical aspects of impactites from the Bosumtwi crater (Ghana), before to move again to Canada for his postdoctoral researches on shatter cones and associated shock-induced microdeformations in minerals (at the University of Western Ontario, London). From 2011 to 2024, Ferrière was the curator of the prestigious meteorite collection and of the impactite collection at the Natural History Museum Vienna. Since 2024 he is Curator of Geology and Meteorites at the Natural History Museum Abu Dhabi.

== Research ==
Ferrière's research activities mainly center around the investigation of meteorites and impact craters. Together with colleagues, he contributed to the discovery and confirmation of five meteorite impact craters (i.e., Keurusselkä crater in Finland, Luizi crater in the Democratic Republic of Congo, Hummeln crater in Sweden, Yallalie crater in Australia, and Nova Colinas in Brazil) and has also discovered and classified a number of meteorites (found in e.g., Egypt, Uruguay, Northwest Africa). In the framework of expeditions, Ferrière has explored a number of confirmed and possible (not yet confirmed) impact craters all around the Earth. Some of his expeditions, in more or less remote areas of the Earth, in his search for possible new meteorite impact craters and meteorites, were supported by National Geographic Society – Waitt Grants. One that was largely featured in the media took place in the Democratic Republic of the Congo where Ferrière discovered and confirmed the impact origin of the Luizi crater

Ferrière is author and co-author of over 115 peer-reviewed research publications, over 250 abstracts presented at international conferences, and of a book on meteorites.

== Awards and honors ==
- 2006 – Student Travel Award (Östersund workshop, Sweden)
- 2006 – Student Travel Award (69th MetSoc Meeting, Switzerland)
- 2007 – Student Travel Award (Kobe International School, Japan)
- 2007 – Barringer Student Travel Award (70th MetSoc Meeting, Arizona)^
- 2007 – LPI Student Travel Award (Bridging the Gap II workshop, Canada)
- 2008 – Barringer Family Fund for Meteorite Impact Research
- 2008 – Student Travel Award (LMI IV Meeting, South Africa)
- 2009 – Barringer Student Travel Award (72nd Metsoc Meeting, France)
- 2013 – Paneth Meteorite Trust Award
- 2023 – Asteroid (227928) named "Ludoferrière"
