= Max Essex =

American virologist (born 1939)

Myron 'Max' Essex
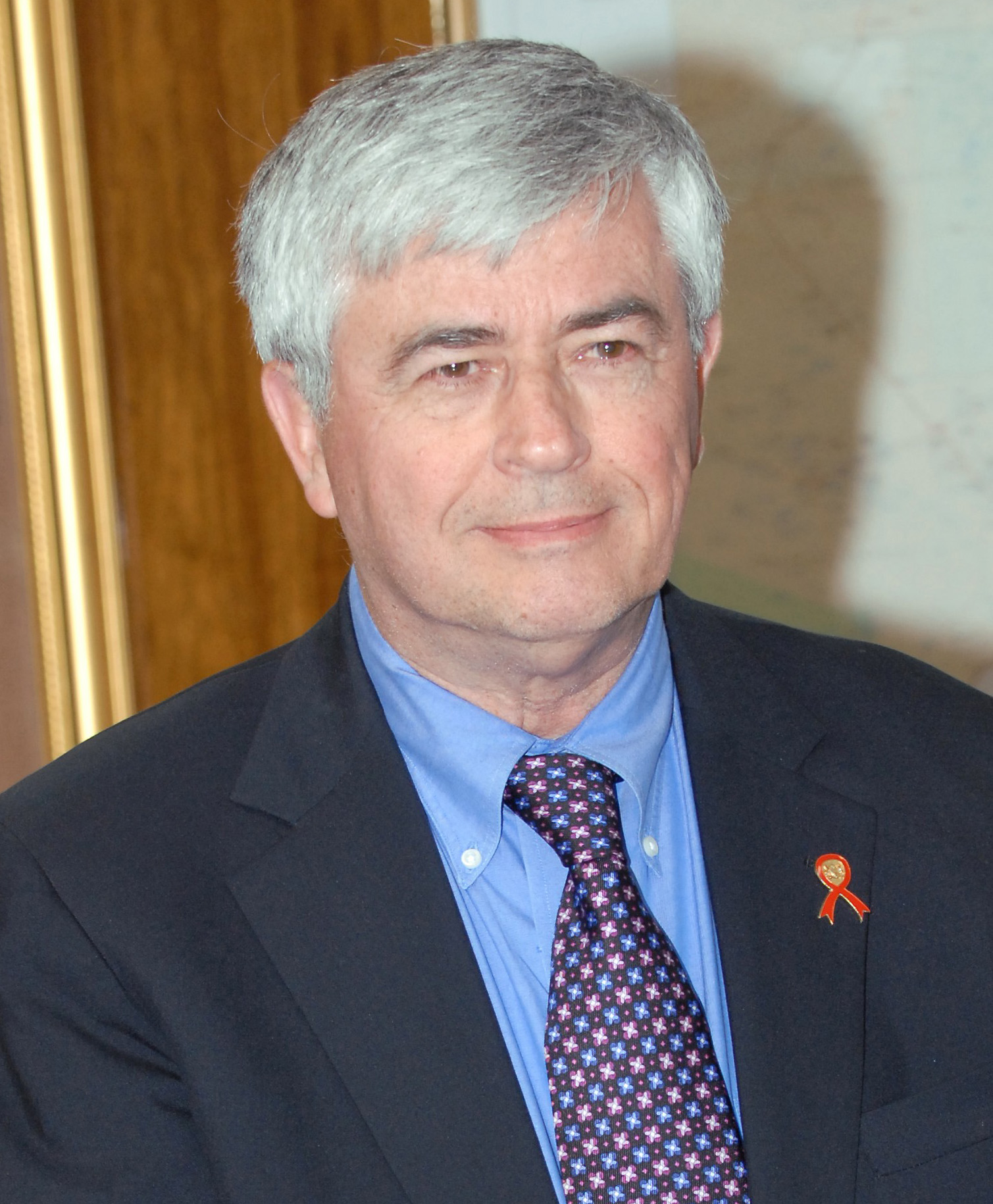
- Max Essex in Botswana, July 2007
- Born: Myron Elmer Essex; 17 August 1937 (age 89); Coventry, Rhode Island
- Education: Michigan State University (DVM); University of California, Davis (PhD)
- Occupations: Virologist, veterinarian, professor of immunology and public health
- Spouse: Dr. Elizabeth Essex
- Children: 2 adult daughters; 5 grandchildren

Myron Elmer "Max" Essex (born August 17, 1939) is the Mary Woodard Lasker Professor of Health Sciences, emeritus in the department of immunology and infectious diseases at Harvard University, chair of the Harvard T.H. Chan School of Public Health AIDS Initiative (HAI) in the department of immunology and infectious diseases, and chair of the Botswana–Harvard AIDS Institute in Gaborone, Botswana. Essex was one of the first to link animal and human retroviruses to immunosuppressive disease, to suspect that a retrovirus was the cause of AIDS, and to determine that HIV could be transmitted through blood and blood products to hemophiliacs and recipients of blood transfusions. With collaborators, Essex also provided the first evidence that HIV could be transmitted by heterosexual intercourse.

In 1984, Essex identified gp120, the virus surface protein that is used worldwide for blood screening, HIV detection, and epidemiological monitoring. With collaborators, including African microbiologist Souleymane Mboup, he discovered the first simian immunodeficiency virus, as well as HIV-2. Since 1986, he has developed programs for AIDS collaboration in Senegal, Thailand, Botswana, India, Mexico, and China. In 1996, Essex helped establish the Botswana–Harvard Partnership for HIV Research and Education (now the Botswana–Harvard AIDS Institute). This is a collaboration between the Ministry of Health in Botswana and HAI.

== Biography ==
Essex was born in Coventry, Rhode Island in 1939. Essex earned his D.V.M. from Michigan State University in 1967. He then earned his Ph.D. from University of California, Davis, in 1970.

He has been married to Elizabeth Essex since 1967. They have two daughters and five grandchildren.

Essex holds ten honorary doctorates and 15 patents and has received the Lasker Award, the highest medical research award given in the United States, jointly with Robert Gallo and Luc Montagnier in 1986. He has published over 500 papers and 12 books, including two editions of AIDS in Africa (ISBN 0306466996), and his latest, Saturday Is for Funerals (ISBN 0674050770). Essex has worked in twelve (12) different nations as a veterinarian and virologist: Botswana, China, Colombia, India, Japan, Nigeria, Senegal, Taiwan, Tanzania, Thailand, U.S., Zaire.

His 45 years of working papers, the Myron Essex papers, 1949–1996, are archived in the Countway Library's Center for the History of Medicine through funding by a Hidden Collections grant from the Harvard University Library (HUL) within the Maximizing Microbiology: Molecular Genetics, Cancer, and Virology, 1936-2000 project. In addition to the Myron Essex papers (1949–1996), the project has already led to the processing of collections of several other microbiologists, including those of Bernard D. Davis, Arthur B. Pardee, Francesc Duran i Reynals, and Luigi Gorini. Essex serves on the Library's Archives Committee. In 2018 Dr. Essex announced his retirement plans.

He has been the primary mentor to eighty (80) postdocs and to 34 doctoral students. He has authored 629 research papers, forty (40) of which have been published in Science or Nature.

== Awards ==
- Elected member, Institute of Medicine (IOM) of the National Academy of Sciences (NAS, now NASEM)
- Fellow, American Academy of Microbiology
- HIV Lifetime Achievement Award for Scientific Contributions from the Institute of Human Virology (IHV) at the University of Maryland School of Medicine, November 2011
- Lifetime Achievement Award, AIDS Society of India, 2014 (in Kolkata). The plaque reads “For his exemplary contribution towards research in HIV/AIDS and for his outstanding leadership in public health.”

== Awards named for Max Essex ==
- Essex Fellowship for Students from Africa, Harvard T.H. Chan School of Public Health, annually since 2007
