= Soumahoro =

Soumahoro is both a given name and a surname. Notable people with the name include:

- Soumahoro Bangaly (born 1991), Ivorian footballer
- Aboubakar Soumahoro (born 1980), Italian-Ivorian trade unionist
- Amadou Soumahoro (1953–2022), Ivorian politician
- Issife Soumahoro (born 1988), French-born Ivorian basketball player
- Maboula Soumahoro (born 1976), French scholar
- Yaya Soumahoro (born 1989), Ivorian footballer
