= Jean-Yves Mollier =

French contemporary history teacher (born 1947)

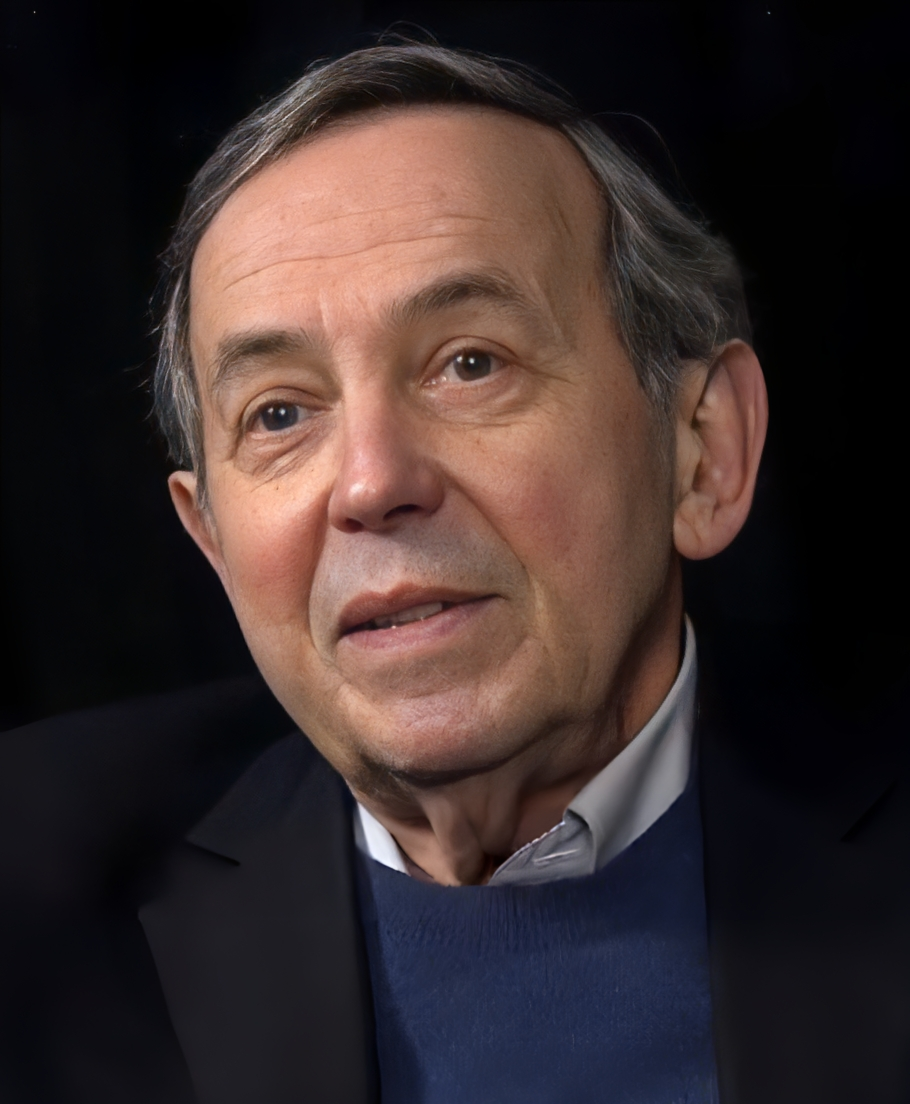
- Born: 1947 (age 78–79); Roanne
- Education: Ph.D
- Occupation: Teacher
- Employer: Versailles Saint-Quentin-en-Yvelines University
- Known for: Historian

Jean-Yves Mollier (born 5 November 1947) is a French contemporary history teacher.

== Biography ==
Mollier is teacher at the Versailles Saint-Quentin-en-Yvelines University. He is specialized in the history of publishing.

He has dedicated his doctoral thesis in French literature at Noël Parfait (1978) and his PhD in History (PhD in Humanities) to "political and cultural history at the heart of the French nineteenth-century" (1986).

He managed the Centre d'histoire culturelle des sociétés contemporaines (Center of contemporary societies Cultural History) from 1998 to 2005, and the Graduate School "Cultures, Organizations, laws" from 2005 to 2007.

He is vice-president of the Association pour le Développement de l’Histoire Culturelle et de la Société des Études romantiques (Association for the Development of Cultural History and Society of Romantic Studies).

== Bibliography ==
- Dans les bagnes de Napoléon III (In the prisons of Napoleon III), Paris, Presses universitaires de France, 1983
- Michel et Calmann Lévy ou la Naissance de l'édition moderne (1836-1891) (Michel and Calmann Levy or the Birth of the modern edition (1836-1891, Paris, Calmann-Lévy, 1984
- Lettres inédites d'Ernest Renan à ses éditeurs Michel et Calmann Lévy (Unpublished letters of Ernest Renan to his publishers Michel and Calmann Lévy), Paris, Calmann-Lévy, 1986
- L′Argent et les lettres. Histoire du capitalisme d'édition (1880-1920) (Money and letters. History of capitalism Edition (1880-1920)), Paris, Fayard, 1988
- Le scandale de Panama (The Panama scandal), Paris, Fayard, 1991
- La plus longue des républiques (1870-1940) (The longest Republics (1870-1940)), Paris, Fayard, 1994 (with Jocelyne George)
- Pierre Larousse et son temps (Pierre Larousse and his period), Paris, Larousse, 1995 (with P. Ory)
- Le commerce de la librairie en France au XIXe siècle (1798-1914) (The bookselling business in France in the nineteenth century (1798-1914)), Paris, IMEC éd.; Éd. de la Maison des sciences de l'homme, 1997
- La Révolution de 1848 en France et en Europe (The Revolution of 1848 in France and Europe), Paris, Éditions Sociales, 1998 (with Sylvie Aprile, Raymond Huard and Pierre Lévêque)
- Louis Hachette (1800-1864). Le fondateur d'un empire (Louis Hachette (1800-1864), The founder of an empire), Paris, Fayard, 1999
- Où va le livre ? (Where goes the book?), Paris : la Dispute, 2000
- Les Mutations du livre et de l'édition dans le monde du XVIIIe siècle à l'an 2000 (Mutations of the book and publishing world of the eighteenth century to 2000), Paris : l'Harmattan; Saint-Nicolas (Québec), Presses de l'université Laval, 2001 (with Jacques Michon)
- La Lecture et ses publics à l'époque contemporaine (Reading and audiences at contemporary). Essais d'histoire culturelle, Paris, PUF, 2001
- L'Abécédaire de la République et du citoyen (The ABC of the Republic and the citizen), Paris, Flammarion, 2002 (with Christian Amalvi, Marie-Christine Chaudonneret and Alice Gérard)
- La Belle Epoque des revues. 1880-1914 (The heyday of magazines. 1880-1914), Paris, Ed. de l'IMEC, 2002 (with Michel Leymarie and Jacqueline Pluet Despatin)
- Les Lectures du peuple en Europe et dans les Amériques (XVIIe-XXe siècles) (Readings of the people in Europe and the Americas (17th-20th centuries)), Bruxelles, Complexe, 2003 (with Hans-Jürgen Lüsebrink, York-Gothart Mix and Patricia Sorel)
- Le Camelot et la rue. Politique et démocratie au tournant des XIXe et XXe (Camelot and the street. Politics and Democracy at the turn of the nineteenth and twentieth), Paris, Fayard, 2004
- Repenser la restauration (Rethinking restoration), Paris : Nouveau Monde éditions, 2005 (with Martine Reid and Jean-Claude Yon)
- Passeurs culturels dans le monde des médias et de l'édition en Europe (XIXe et XXe siècles) (Cultural smugglers in the world of media and publishing in Europe (nineteenth and twentieth centuries)), Villeurbanne, Presses de l'ENSSIB, 2005 (with Diana Cooper-Richet and Ahmed Silem)
- Les Goncourt dans leur siècle. Un siècle de "Goncourt" (The Goncourt in their century. A century of Goncourt), Villeneuve d'Ascq, Presses du septentrion, 2005 (with Jean-Louis Cabanès, Pierre-Jean Dufief and Robert Kopp)
- La Censure de l'imprimé. France, Belgique, Québec et Suisse romande. XIXe et XXe siècles (Censorship of print. France, Belgium, Quebec and French-speaking Switzerland. Nineteenth and twentieth centuries), Québec, Nota Bene, 2006
- Culture de masse et culture médiatique en Europe et dans les Amériques (1860-1940) (Mass culture and media culture in Europe and the Americas (1860-1940)), Paris : PUF, 2006 (with Jean-François Sirinelli and François Vallotton)
- Politica, Naçao et Ediçao. O lugar dos impressos na construçao da vida politica. Brasil, Europa e Americas nos seculos XVIII-XX, São Paulo, Annablume Editora, 2006 (with Eliana and Freitas Dutra)
- Au bonheur du feuilleton. Naissance et mutations d'un genre (France, États-Unis, Grande-Bretagne, XVIIIe-XXe siècles) (Happiness of the series. Mutations and birth of a genre (France, United States, Great Britain, eighteenth and twentieth centuries)), Paris, Créaphis, 2007 (with Marie-Françoise Cachin, Diana Cooper-Richet and Claire Parfait)
- Édition, presse et pouvoir en France au XXe siècle (Newspapers, books and power in France in the twentieth century), Paris, Fayard, 2008
- La Production de l'immatériel. Théories, représentations et pratiques de la culture au XIXe siècle (Production of the immaterial. Theories, practices and representations of culture in the nineteenth century), Saint-Étienne, Presses de l'université de Saint-Étienne, 2008 (with Philippe Régnier and Alain Vaillant)
- Cinq centimes par jour. Pratiques commerciales d’un éditeur engagé, Publications des Universités de Rouen et du Havre, 2008 (avec François Gaudin)
- Libros, lecturas, lectores. Francia, siglos XVIII-XX, Cahier hors série de Secuencia. Revista de historia y cencias sociales, Mexico, Instituto de Investigaciones historicas, 2009
- Dictionnaire d'histoire culturelle de la France contemporaine (Cultural history dictionary of contemporary France), with Christian Delporte and Jean-François Sirinelli, PUF, Quadrige dicos poche, Paris, 2010
- Histoire de la librairie Larousse. 1852-2010, Fayard, 2012, (with Bruno Dubot).
- L’âge d’or de la corruption parlementaire. 1930-1980, Paris, Éditions Perrin, 2018.
- Chez Wepler, 14 place Clichy, Paris, Éditions Michel Beissières, 2018, 135 p.
- Interdiction de publier - La censure d'hier à aujourd'hui, Joinville-le-Pont, Éditions Double ponctuation, 2020, 174 p.
- Histoire des libraires et de la librairie de l'Antiquité jusqu'à nos jours, Arles, Imprimerie nationale éditions/Actes Sud, 2021, 216 p.
- Cornélius Herz. Portrait d'un lobbyiste franco-américain à la Belle Époque, Paris, éditions du Félin, 2021, 560 p.
- Brève histoire de la concentration dans le monde du livre, Montreuil, Libertalia, 2022, 168 p.
- Les éditions Calmann-Lévy de la Belle Époque à la Seconde Guerre mondiale, Paris, Calmann-Lévy, 2023, 384 p.
- Interdiction de publier - La censure d'hier à aujourd'hui - 2e édition revue et augmentée, Joinville-le-Pont, Éditions Double ponctuation, 2024.
- Panama, un canal pour l'histoire, Paris, Flammarion, 2025, 288 p.
