= Géraldine Chauvet =

French mezzo-soprano

Géraldine Chauvet is a French operatic mezzo-soprano.

== Early life ==
She was born in Bayeux and studied music at the University of Tours, initially specializing in flute and piano. She studied singing with Udo Reinmann, later with Mezzo-soprano Grace Bumbry in Salzburg and finally with Mezzo-soprano Brigitte Fassbaender.

== Career ==
Chauvet came to world attention in 2009, appearing in Carmen at the Arena di Verona conducted by Placido Domingo with the stage direction of Franco Zeffirelli.

In 2011 she debuted in the US, first at Avery Fisher Hall as Adriano in Rienzi by Wagner and six months later at the Metropolitan Opera House (Lincoln Center) as Sesto in La clemenza di Tito by Mozart. She also debuted in Asia : China, Japan, South Korea & United Arab Emirates performing:

- Samson et Dalila as Dalila, in Seoul, together with José Cura as Samson
- Carmen, in Tokyo, together with Placido Domingo as Don José, with TV Broadcast, released on DVD
- Il Barbiere di Siviglia as Rosina, in Oman at the National Opera
- Il Barbiere di Siviglia as Rosina, at the Pechino National Opera Beijing

== Performances 2008–2019 ==
- Adalgisa in Norma at the Teatro Comunale di Bologna and the Teatro de Palma de Mallorca (2008)
- Soloist in Rossini's Petite Messe Solennelle with the Fondazione Arturo Toscanini in Parma (2008)
- Donna Anna in Pacini's Don Giovanni Tenorio at the Rossini in Wildbad Festival (2008)
- Emilia in Rossini's Otello, Rossini in Wildbad Festival, recorded by Naxos (2008)
- The title role in Carmen at Teatro Comunale Luciano Pavarotti in Modena (2009), the Ravenna Festival (2009) and the Arena di Verona (2009) conducted by Plácido Domingo
- Charlotte in Werther at Teatro F.Cilea in Italy, beside Giuseppe Filianoti, conducted by Alain Guingal
- Donna Elvira in Don Giovanni at the Arena of Avenches in Swisse (2009)
- Rosina in Il Barbiere di Siviglia with Opera Giocosa of Savona in Italy (2009)
- Carmen with Plácido Domingo as Don Josè at the Forum Halle A in Tokyo, in the Domingo Gala, released on DVD (2010)
- Il diluvio universale by Donizetti at the St.Gallen Staadttheater (2010)
- Requiem by Donizetti at St.Gallen Festspiele (2010)
- Carmen (title role) at Arena di Verona (2010)
- Adalgisa in Norma (first time in France) at Festival du Theatre Antique de Sanxay (2010)
- Carmen (title role) at the Grand Theatre de Bordeaux (2010)
- Il Postino (Donna Rosa) at Theater an der Wien (with Plácido Domingo as Pablo Neruda) conducted by Jesus Lopez Cobos (2010)
- Carmen (title role) at the Teatro di San Carlo in Naples, Mischa van Hoecke (director), Alain Guingal (conductor), television broadcast (2011)
- Carmen (title role) at "Les Soirées Lyriques de Sanxay" of the Festival de Sanxay (with Thiago Arancam and Alexander Vinogradov) (2011)
- Samson et Dalila (as Dalila) with Josè Cura, Sejong Cultural Center of Seoul (September 2011)
- Opera on Ice' at the Arena di Verona (broadcast in 40 Countries and released on DVD (October 2011)
- Les dialogues des Carmelites (Mère Marie) at the Opéra de Massy (Mère Marie) 2012
- Rienzi (Adriano), New York (2012)
- Romeo et Juliette by Berlioz, Netherlands Television Symphony Orchestra of Amsterdam and Utrecht (2012)
- Nabucco (Fenena) at Washington National Opera (2012)
- Zerlina in Don Giovanni, opening night of the 2012 season at the Arena di Verona,
- Rienzi (Adriano) at the Theatre du Capitole de Toulouse (2012)
- Sesto in La clemenza di Tito, Metropolitan Opera debut (10 December 2012)
- Les Dialogues des Carmelites (Mère Marie) at the Grand Opèra de Bordeaux (January 2013)
- Jenufa (Kostelnicka) at the Opéra d'Avignon (February 2013)
- Verdi Requiem at the (San Antonio Symphony) in USA (May 2013)
- Il Barbiere di Siviglia (Rosina) at the (Pechino Beijing Opera) in China, on 2013
- Nabucco (Fenena) at the (Arena di Verona) (August 2013)
- Il Barbiere di Siviglia (Rosina) at the (Muscat Theater) of Oman (September 2013)
- Verdi Requiem at the (Washington Kennedy Center) in (November 2013)
- Il Barbiere di Siviglia (Rosina) at the (Teatro San Carlo di Napoli) (January 2014)
- Roberto Devereux (Sara) at the (New York Lincoln Center) with (Mariella Devia) (2014)
- Charlotte Salomon (Franziska Kann) at the (Salzburger Festspiele) (2014)
- Opera Gala at the (Festival d'Annecy) with TV Broadcast (2014)
- Carmen (Lead Role) at the (New Orleans Opera) with (Bryan Hymel) (2014)

Among her Engagements in the Season 2015 – 2016 – 2017 :

- La damnation de Faust as Margherita at the Opéra de Bordeaux
- Hamlet as Reine Gertrude at the Opéra d'Avignon
- Carmen (Lead Role) at the Washington National Opera
- La Gioconda as Laura at the Theatre Municipal de Santiago de Chile (2016)
- Carmen (Lead Role) at the Herodius Atticus of Athens (2016)
- Gala at the Spanish Castle of Praha (TV Broadcast) (2016)
- Carmen (Lead Role) at the Goteborg Sweden Opera (2017)
- La Gioconda as Laura at the Malmo Operan (2017)
- Cavalleria Rusticana as Santuzza at the Opera du Rhin de Strasbourg (2017)
- Les Contes d'Hoffmann as Nicklauss at The Metropolitan Opera of New York (2017)
- Nabucco as Fenena at Arena di Verona (2018)
- Carmen (Leading Role) at Arena di Verona (2018)
- UPCOMING DATES 2019
- Nabucco as Fenena at Hamburg Staatsoper (2019)
- Don Giovanni by Mozart, as Donna Elvira at Innsbruck Landestheater (2019)
- Les Contes d'Hoffmann as Giulietta at Lausanne Opera (2019)
