= Raymond Chevallier =

French historian, archaeologist and Latinist (1929-2004)

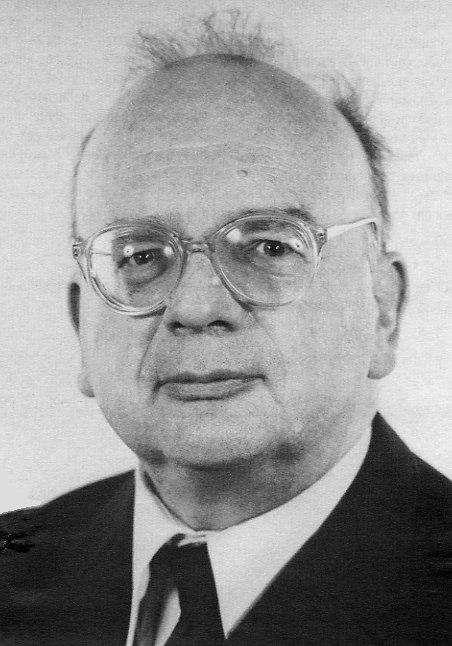
- Born: 21 June 1929; Bourg-en-Bresse
- Died: 30 November 2004 (aged 75)
- Occupations: Historian; Archaeologist

Raymond Chevallier (21 June 1929 – 30 November 2004) was a French historian, archaeologist and Latinist.

A former member of the École française de Rome, honorary president of the "Société française de Photogrammétrie et télédétection", he was a lecturer at the École pratique des hautes études, then teaching assistant and finally professor of Latin language and literature at the University of Tours. His seminar of historic topography and photo interpretation was attended by numerous French aerial prospectors: R. Agache, J. Dassié, R. Goguey, D. Jalmain, L. Monguilan, etc. He specialized in the study of Roman roads and ancient traces by aerial photography.

== Career and contributions ==
Born in Bourg-en-Bresse in 1929 to a family of teachers, Raymond Chevallier entered the Ecole Normale Supérieure in 1950. After he passed his agrégation in letters and graduated from the Ecole pratique des hautes études IVth section in 1955, he left for the École française de Rome of which he was a member from 1956 to 1958, and soon became one of the specialists of ancient Northern Italy.

On his return to France, he served as an assistant to the Sorbonne, from 1958 to 1962, and then as assistant professor at the École Pratique des Hautes Etudes in 1963. He was then appointed to the Faculty of Letters at Tours, He spent the rest of his academic career there, first as an instructor, then as a professor of universities, for many years running the Institute of Latin Studies at this institution.

His indefatigable activity as a researcher led Raymond Chevallier to found and preside the André-Piganiol Research Center and to organize annually numerous symposia. Raymond Chevallier was a resident member of the Société des Antiquaires de France, which he presided over in 1997, and his international reputation earned him the distinction of becoming a correspondent of the Pontifical Academy of Archaeology in 1978 and member of the German Archaeological Institute in 1986. Several decorations over the years testified to the quality of his work.

His military service, carried out in the air force, revealed to him the interest of aerial photography for archaeological research and made him a very active emulator of the great precursors in this field, Father Antoine Poidebard and colonel Jean Baradez. His career in the reserve led him to the rank of Colonel. It enabled him to keep abreast of the latest advances in technology and to perfect certain applications, such as the detection of traces of ancient cadastres, Roman roads or disappeared agglomerations. This field of research led him, from 1976 to 1980, to the presidency of the "Société française de photogrammétrie et télédétection".

Raymond Chevallier was a particularly prolific author. Some fifty books deal with his favorite subjects: Roman historians, ancient Northern Italy, independent and Roman Gaul, aerial photography and its archaeological applications, not to mention several volumes of the Que sais-je? series and a high volume of collaborative works. Hundreds of articles in French and foreign scholarly publications come in addition to these books, including Archéologia. He was also called upon to participate in the Grand Larousse encyclopédique, the Encyclopædia Universalis, and the Encyclopédie of the Pléiade. He made several photographic exhibitions on Ancient history, and gave numerous lectures both in France and abroad.

On 30 November 2004, aged 75, Raymond Chevallier rests with his wife, in the cemetery of Belmont, in Ain.

== Publications ==
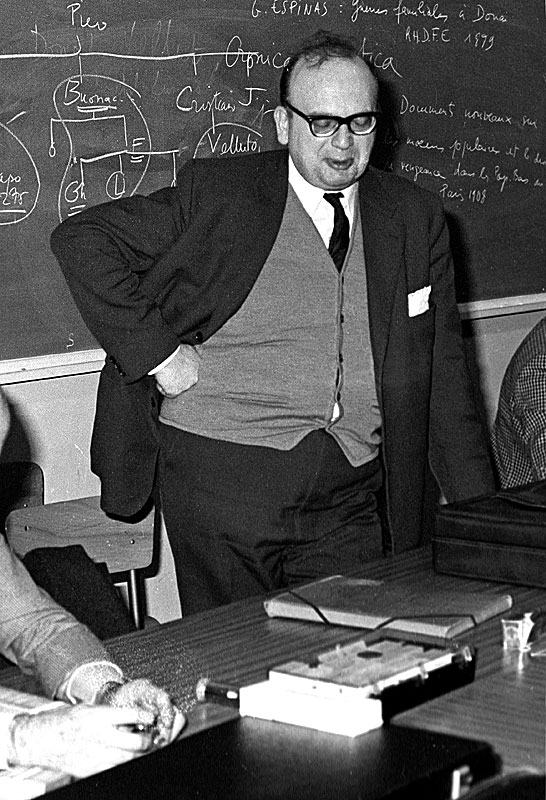
Professor Raymond Chevallier

- 1960: Le Milieu stoïcien au Ier siècle de notre ère ou l'âge héroïque du stoïcisme romain, Les Belles Lettres
- 1961: Rome et la Germanie au Ier siècle de notre ère, Brussels, serie "Latomus"
- 1964: L'Avion à la découverte du passé, Fayard
- 1968: Dictionnaire de la littérature latine, Larousse
- 1971: La Photographie aérienne, Armand Colin
- 1972: Les Voies romaines, A. Colin, twice translated and published in English
- 1975: Tabula Imperii Romani, feuille M 31, Picard
- 1975: A.N.R.W., Gallia Narbonensis, (three participations to)
- 1975: Gallia Lugdunensis
- 1982: Les Méthodes de prospection archéologiques
- 1983: La Romanisation de la Celtique du Pô. Essai d'histoire provinciale, École française de Rome
- 1984: Iter Italicum, Les Belles lettres, Paris, 1984 (with E. Chevallier)
- 1986: Ostie, ville et port, Les Belles Lettres, 1986
- 1987: L'Antiquité gréco-romaine vue par le siècle des Lumières, Tours, Centre de recherches André Piganiol
- 1988: Voyages et déplacements dans l'Empire romain, Armand Colin
- 1990: Aquilée et la romanisation de l'Europe
- 1991: L'Artiste, le collectionneur et le faussaire. Pour une sociologie de l'art romain, Armand Colin
- 1997: Les Voies romaines, Paris, Picard
- 2000: Lecture du temps dans l'espace, Picard

== Bibliography ==
- R. Bedon, "Raymond Chevallier (1929-2004)", in Archéologia, 418, January 2005, (pp. 6), and in Les espaces clos dans l'architecture en Gaule Romaine et dans les régions voisines, Caesarodunum, XL, 2006 Limoges, PULIM, 2007, (pp. 163–16)
- Ch. Guittard, "In memoriam Raymond Chevallier (1929-2004)", in Revue des Études Latines, volume 83, 2005 (2006), (pp. 16–17).
- J.-J. Maffre, Obituary, in Bulletin de la Société nationale des Antiquaires de France, 2004–2005, (pp. 240–242).
