= HIV Drug Resistance Database =

Database at Stanford University that tracks mutations of HIV

HIV Drug Resistance Database, also known as Stanford HIV RT and Protease Sequence Database, is a database at Stanford University that tracks 93 common mutations of HIV. It has been recompiled in 2008 listing 93 common mutations, after its initial mutation compilation in 2007 of 80 mutations. The latest list utilizes data from other laboratories in Europe, Canada and the United States including more than 15,000 sequences from untreated individuals.

== See also ==
- Subtypes of HIV
- HIV drug resistance
