= University of Tours =

University in France

Coordinates: 47.35633°N 0.70312°E

- Université de Tours
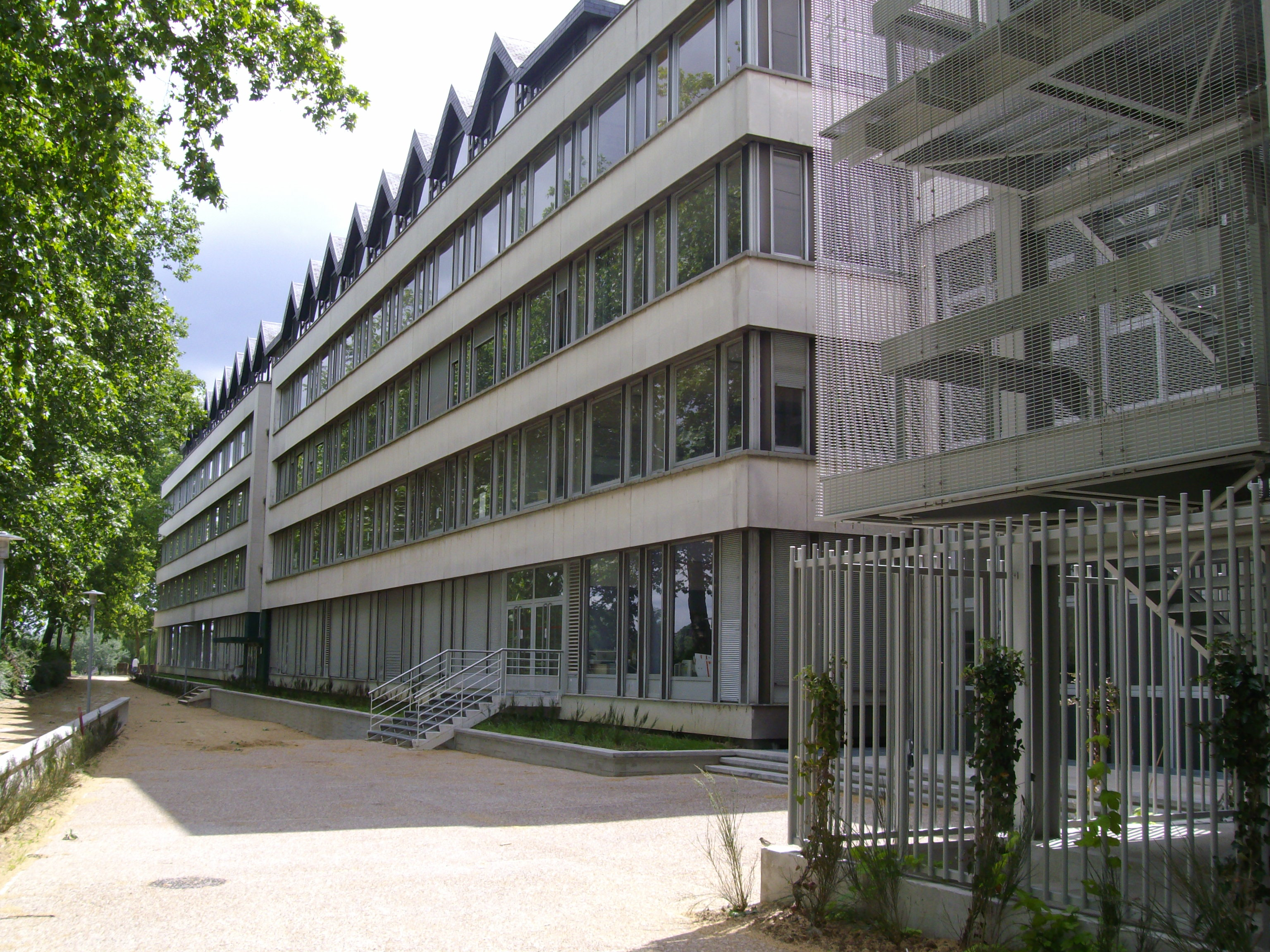
- Type: Public
- Established: 1969
- President: Arnaud Giacometti
- Administrative staff: 1,201
- Students: 30,359 (2018-2019)
- Location: Tours, France
- Website: www.univ-tours.fr

The University of Tours (French: Université de Tours), formerly François Rabelais University of Tours (French: Université François Rabelais), is a public university in Tours, France. Founded in 1969, the university was formerly named after the French writer François Rabelais. It is the largest university in the Centre-Val de Loire region. As of July 2015, it is a member of the regional university association Leonardo da Vinci consolidated University.

== History ==
The University of Tours was established as part of efforts to modernize and democratize higher education in France after the events of 1968. The university was created by grouping together a number of older educational institutions.

== Organisation ==
The university has a number of campuses, often dedicated to a specific faculty, distributed across the city of Tours:

- Plat d’Étain (administration and offices)
- Tanneurs (languages and literature, arts and humanities)
- Tonnellé (medicine)
- Portalis/Deux-Lions (engineering, law, economics, geography)
- Grandmont (sciences, pharmaceutical studies)
- Pont-Volant (contains a University Institute of Technology)
- Fromont
- Émile Zola

The university also has a satellite campus in Blois.

== Academics ==
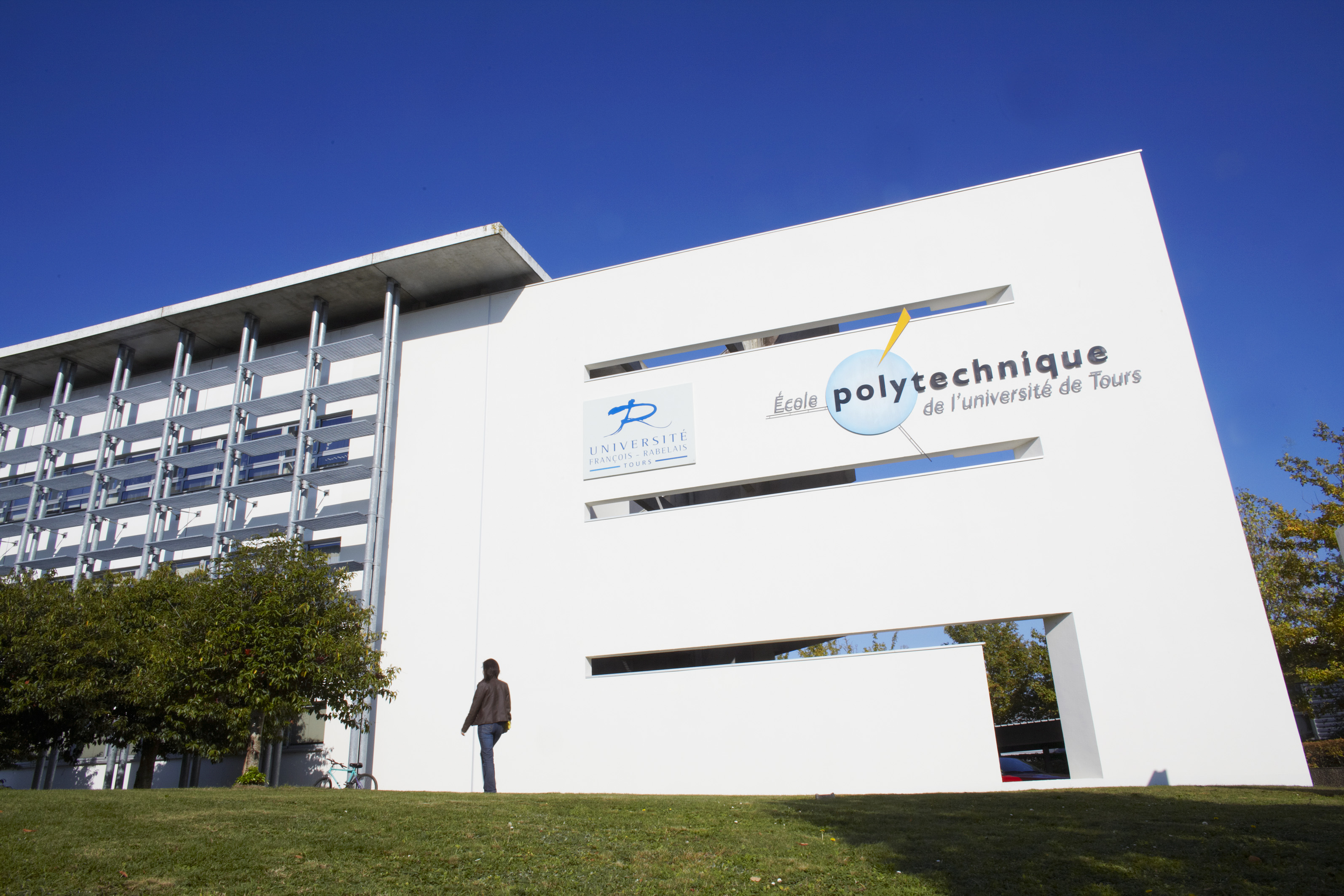
The Portalis Campus.

The university comprises seven departments, as well as an engineering school and two technology institutes:

- Department of Arts and Humanities
- Center for Advanced Renaissance Studies (Centre d'Etudes Supérieures de la Renaissance)
- Department of Law, Economics and Social Sciences
- Department of Literature and Languages
- Department of Medicine
- Department of Sciences and Technology
- Department of Pharmacy
- School of Engineering (École polytechnique de l'université de Tours)
- Tours University Institute of Technology (Institut Universitaire de Technologie de Tours)
- Blois University Institute of Technology (Institut Universitaire de Technologie de Blois)

The university offers bachelor, master and doctorate degrees in line with the Bologna Process. It also provides Technological Diploma courses (diplômes universitaire de technologie) through the two University Institutes of Technology. Several other institutions operate within the framework of the university:

- École publique de journalisme de Tours, a semi-autonomous journalism school affiliated to the university.
- Centre hospitalier régional et universitaire de Tours (CHU de Tours), a grouping of six regional hospitals affiliated to the university that collaborate on health services and medical training.
- Institut européen d'histoire et des cultures de l'alimentation, a humanities and social sciences research center that studies the history of food cultures.

== Research ==
Grandmont Campus (Sciences) - Building L

Research at the university is at the forefront in the social sciences and humanities in the study of the Renaissance through the Graduate Center of the Renaissance since 1956 and in knowledge of food heritage through a program ambitious research at the Institute of European history and culture of food.

The University of Tours is also distinguished in the field of materials for energy technology research with the Microelectronic at CERTEM in collaboration with ST Microelectronics in 1996.

The research also extends into the field of medical imaging and bio-medicine, oncology, and eminently in the study of autism at the University Hospital of Tours. Geo-science and environment with the study of insects at the Institute for Research on the biology of the insect (IRBI). Since 1969 the CESA, Planning Department today Polytech'Tours research in the field of cities, territories and societies is deemed to France. Finally the University of Tours works in the field of mathematical research through the Laboratory of Theoretical Physics and Mathematics.

University rankings

Global – Overall
- ARWU World: 901-1000

National – Overall
- ARWU National: 28-30

== Rankings ==
In 2022, the Academic Ranking of World Universities placed François Rabelais University in the 901-1000 band of universities in the world and in the 28-30 band of universities in France.

François Rabelais University undergraduate law program is ranked 3rd in France by Eduniversal, with 3 stars (2016/17).

== Notable people ==
Faculty

- Raymond Chevallier (1929-2004) - historian, archaeologist and Latinist
- Michel Arrivé (1936-2017) - novelist, short story writer, linguist
- Maurice Sartre (born 1944) - historian
- Jean Germain (1947-2015) - university president; socialist politician
- Jean-Paul Goux (born 1948) - writer
- Gregory Grefenstette (born 1956) - French and American researcher and professor in computer science
- Christian Delporte (born 1958 in Paris) - specialist in political and cultural history of France in the twentieth century
- Éric de Chassey (born 1965, Pittsburgh, Pennsylvania, U.S.) - historian of French art, art critic
- Kilien Stengel (born 1972) - gastronomic author, restaurateur, and cookbook writer
- Claire Sotinel - historian; expert on Italy in late antiquity, religion, society, and prosopography

Alumni

- Moshe Prywes (1914-1998) - Israeli physician and first president of Ben-Gurion University of the Negev.
- Bruno Schroder (1933-2019) - British banker and billionaire
- Sadreddin Elahi (1934-2021) - Iranian journalist and author
- Peter Stasiuk (born 16 July 1943 in Roblin, Manitoba, Canada) - Australian Ukrainian Greek Catholic hierarch
- Catherine Chalier (1947-) - philosopher
- Bruno Latour (1947-2022) - philosopher
- Marie-Laure Augry (born 1947, in Tours) - France 3 journalist.
- Jean-Pierre Ouvrard (1948-1992) - musicologist, music educator and choral conductor
- Adolé Isabelle Glitho-Akueson (born 1949, in Benin) - Professor of Animal Biology at the University of Lome.
- Souleymane Mboup (born 1951) - Senegalese microbiologist, medical researcher, and colonel in the Armed Forces of Senegal
- Chioma Opara (born 1951 in Jos, Nigeria) - author and academic whose work primarily focuses on West African feminism
- Jean-Daniel Flaysakier ((1951-2021) - physician and journalist
- Patrick Pietropoli (born 1953) - painter and sculptor
- Amadou Koné (born 1953, in what is now Burkina Faso) - taught literature, culture and African history at Georgetown University
- Géraldine Legendre (born 1953) - French-American cognitive scientist and linguist
- Regina Yaou (1955-2017) - writer from Côte d'Ivoire
- Catherine Colonna (born 1956) - diplomat and politician
- Mark Ormerod (civil servant) (born 1957) - British civil servant and chief executive of the Supreme Court of the United Kingdom from 2015 to 2020
- Sabine Thillaye (born 1959) - French-German entrepreneur and politician (LREM)
- Philippe Briand (born 1960, in Tours) - member of the National Assembly(LR)
- Laurent Percerou (born 1961) - bishop of the Catholic Church
- Renaud Machart (born 1962) - journalist, music critic, radio producer and music producer
- Joël Bruneau (born 1963) - politician (LR)
- Éric Brunet (born 1964) - author, political commentator and radio host
- Fabrice Lhomme (born 1965) - investigative journalist for Le Monde
- Alexandra Goujon (born 1972) - political scientist
- Harry Roselmack (born 1973, in Tours) - TF1 journalist.
- Stéphanie Rist (born 1973) - rheumatologist and politician (LREM)
- Maboula Soumahoro (born 1976 in Paris) - scholar and Afro-feminist
- Jean-Pascal Chaigne (born 1977) - composer
- Géraldine Chauvet - operatic mezzo-soprano
- Charlotte Opimbat - Congolese politician
- Ludovic Ferrière (born 1982 in Blois, France) - geologist and curator of meteorite collection at the Natural History Museum, Vienna, Austria

Honorary degree recipients

- Martín Berasategui (born 1960) - Spanish chef expert in Basque cuisine

== See also ==
- List of public universities in France by academy
