= Jean-Daniel Flaysakier =

French doctor and journalist (1951–2021)

- Born: Jean-Daniel Flajszakier; 23 September 1951; Tours, France
- Died: 7 October 2021 (aged 70); Les Sables-d'Olonne, France
- Education: University of Tours; Harvard University
- Occupations: Physician journalist
- Employer: France Télévisions

Jean-Daniel Flaysakier, born Jean-Daniel Flajszakier (23 September 1951 – 7 October 2021) was a French doctor and journalist. He was the health and medicine correspondent for Antenne 2 and France 2 from 1980 to 2018.

== Biography ==
Born as Jean-Daniel Flajszakier, he francisized his name to Flaysakier. He earned a degree in medicine from the University of Tours and worked on the team which developed the first hepatitis B vaccine. He then earned a master's degree in epidemiology from Harvard University. Upon his return to France, he worked for written press, radio, and television.

From 1985 to 1991, Flaysakier was a health columnist on the Antenne 2 morning show Télématin, hosted by William Leymergie. He then became Deputy Editor-in-Chief of France 2 while simultaneously working in oncology. He contributed to the popularization of medicine on television, where he worked for 33 years. On 7 October 2018, he announced on his Twitter account that he would be retiring from France 2 at the end of the month. He was occasionally criticized for his comments on unjustified medical acts.

Flaysakier died of heart failure in Les Sables-d'Olonne on 7 October 2021 at the age of 70.

== Publication ==
- Santé publique et responsabilité des médias (1997)
