= Jean-Paul Goux =

French writer (born 1948)

Jean-Paul Goux (born 1948) is a French writer. He taught literature at the University of Tours for many years, and now lives in Besançon. The author of more than a dozen books, he is best known for two trilogies:

- Les Champs de fouilles, consisting of Les Jardins de Morgante, La Commémoration, and La Maison forte
- Les Quartiers d’hiver, consisting of L’Embardée, Les Hautes falaises, and Le Séjour à Chenecé
