= Patrick Pietropoli =

French painter and sculptor

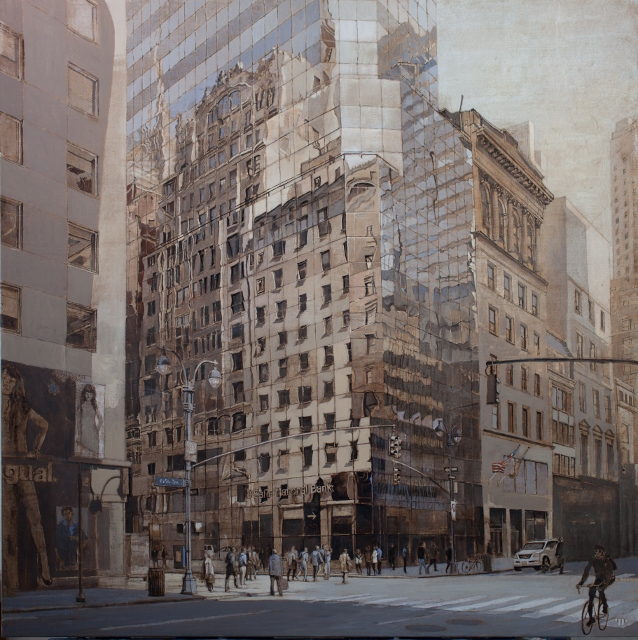
- Born: Patrick Pietropoli; 31 January 1953 (age 73); Paris, France
- Known for: Painter, sculptor

Patrick Pietropoli (born 31 January 1953) is a self-taught French painter and sculptor who has been recognized as an established artist in France since the mid 1980s. He is most notable for his extremely detailed, large-scale cityscapes paintings; however, he is also well known for his work on mid-relief sculpture.

== Early life and education ==
Patrick Pietropoli was born 31 January 1953 in Paris, France. He developed his passion for painting from an early age. In his childhood Patrick spent many days at his grandparents’ house drawing for hours at a time and visiting local galleries in Paris with his grandfather.

In 1975 he passed CAPES French national exam in History to become a history professor. In 1978 Pietropoli received master's degree in Ancient History from François Rabelais University in Paris and taught history in France until 1986.

== Career ==
Patrick Pietropoli began exhibiting in France in 1983 and by 1986 due to the rapid success he was able to quit teaching and focus entirely on art. Pietropoli’s early works were influenced by ‘pittura colta’ movement. His first solo exhibition in 1983 at Gallery Verododa in Paris featured paintings based on sketches of the Annunciation's depiction in Florentine churches of Italy. By the end of 1900s Patrick Pietropoli became inspired by the Venetian old masters of 18th century. With his meticulous attention to detail, Pietropoli was said to join ‘vedutisti’ in his quest to depict timeless urban landscapes. In his own words he ‘refused the picturesque nature of street scenes, choosing to portray urban landscapes akin to the teeming, gaily colored world of the paintings of Canaletto or Guardi’

Jean-Pierre Delarge commented how Pietropoli's "taste for antiquity asserts large paintings" and he "finds the pallet and the Corot format for views of Rome or Venice, empty of any living being, which increases the desired distance from the ocher color blur, this time under a golden sky".

In 1986-89 Patrick Pietropoli created a monumental sculpture, commissioned by the Mutuality of Pas-de-Calais, Paris, France. During 1998-2001 he exhibited small scale mid-relief sculpture at Art Paris and SAGA art fair in Paris, France. In 2000 Musée national de la Marine, Place de la Concorde in Paris acquired two of his paintings for permanent collection.

Since 2001 Patrick Pietropoli has been exhibiting throughout United States in solo and group shows as well as international art fairs, including Art Miami New York, Art Southampton, Art Hamptons, Art Wynwood, Palm Beach Art Fair, Art Chicago. At the same time he also continued to exhibit in his native France and across Europe being represented by Galerie Felli, Galerie Claudine Legrand, The Cynthia Corbett Gallery, Galerie CGB.

In 2008 he moved to New York City and was granted an EB-1 visa to the United States in 2011.

== Museum installations ==
- Feb 2017, Civic Museum of Crema, Crema, Italy.
- Oct 2016 - Jan 2017, Espace St Jean exhibiting hall, Museum of Melun, France.
- Oct 2013, "Salle Friese" exhibiting hall, Print Museum, Saint-Fargeau-Ponthierry, France.
- Oct 2010 - Jan 2011, Espace St Jean exhibiting hall, Museum of Melun, France. The Museum located at the de Vaux-le-Vicomte acquired one painting for permanent collection
- Sept - Oct 2006, Civic Museum of Crema, Crema, Italy.
