= Michel Arrivé =

French novelist and academic (1936–2017)

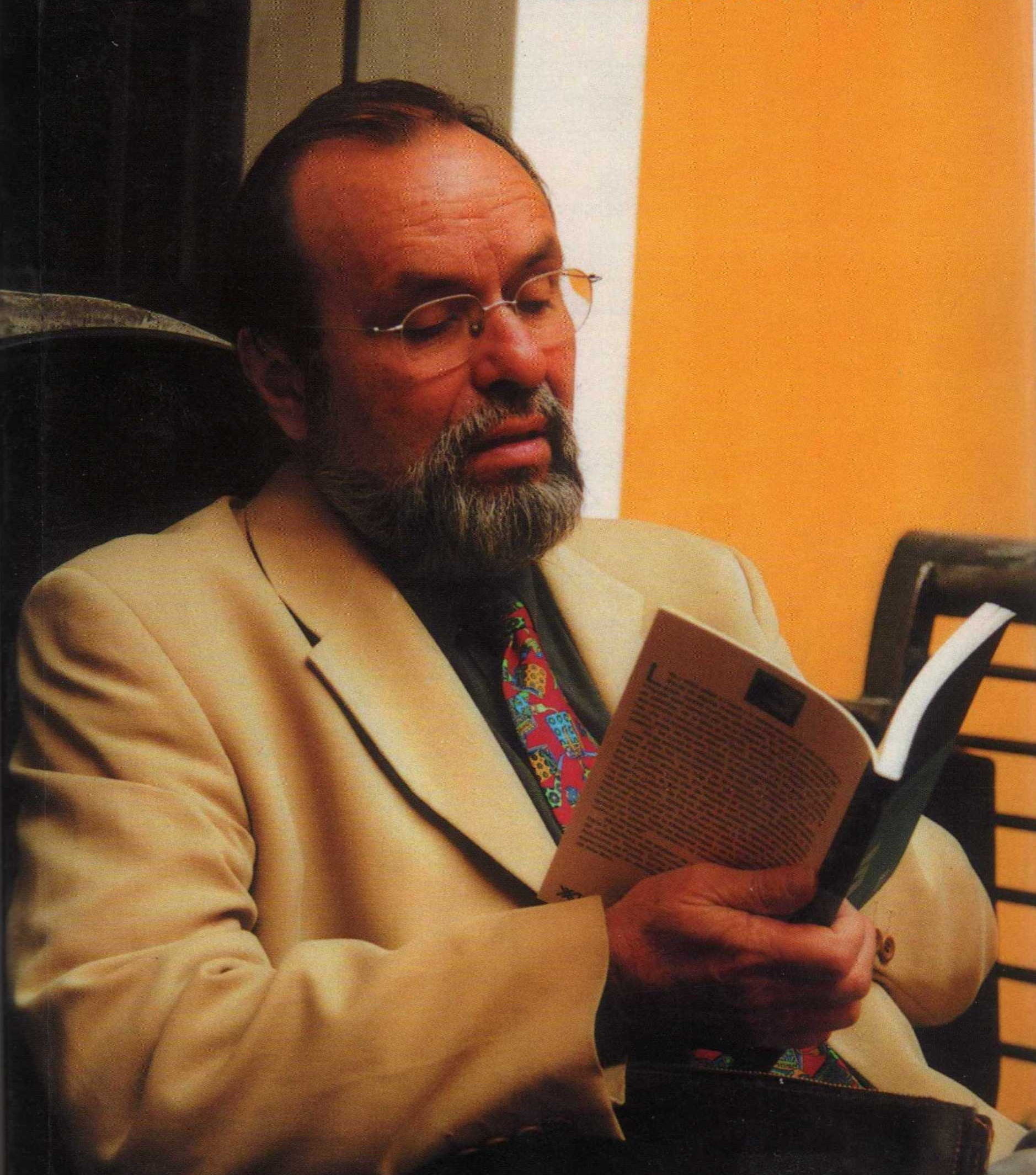
- Born: 7 December 1936; Neuilly-sur-Seine, France
- Died: 3 April 2017 (aged 80); Saint-Cloud, France
- Education: Lycée Louis-le-Grand
- Occupations: Linguist, author

Michel Arrivé (7 December 1936 – 3 April 2017) was a French novelist, short story writer, linguist and academic. He was a Professor of Linguistics and Semiotics at Paris Nanterre University from 1983 to 2006. He authored several novels and short stories.

== Early life ==
Michel Arrivé was born on 7 December 1936 in Neuilly-sur-Seine near Paris. His father was an engineer and his mother was a schoolteacher. His father was arrested in 1940, and Arrivé was raised by his extended family during the war.

Arrivé earned his Baccalauréat at 16. He passed Khâgne at the Lycée Louis-le-Grand and earned the agrégation at 21.

== Career ==
Arrivé began his career as a high school teacher in Évreux and Pontoise. He subsequently became Frédéric Deloffre's assistant at the University of Paris. He taught linguistics at the University of Tours, until he became a Professor of Linguistics and Semiotics at Paris Nanterre University in 1983. He retired in 2006. During the course of his career, he published academic research about Alfred Jarry, Sigmund Freud, Jacques Lacan and Ferdinand de Saussure.

Arrivé was also a novelist and short story writer in 1977.

== Personal life and death ==
Arrivé got married at 19 and had his first child at 20. He died on 3 April 2017 in Saint-Cloud near Paris.

== Selected works ==
=== Linguistics ===
- Arrivé, Michel (1976). Lire Jarry. Brussels: Éditions Complexe. ISBN 9782870270042. OCLC 848501836.
- Arrivé, Michel (1986). Linguistique et psychanalyse : Freud, Saussure, Hjelmslev, Lacan et les autres. Paris: Méridiens/Klincksieck. ISBN 9782865631605. OCLC 642211196.
- Arrivé, Michel (1994). Langage et psychanalyse, linguistique et inconscient. Paris: Presses Universitaires de France. ISBN 9782130464648. OCLC 231640366.
- Arrivé, Michel (2007). À la recherche de Ferdinand de Saussure. Paris: Presses Universitaires de France. ISBN 9782130559702. OCLC 237134934.
- Arrivé, Michel (2008). Du côté de chez Saussure. Limoges: Lambert-Lucas. ISBN 9782915806885. OCLC 602011289.

=== Short stories ===
- Arrivé, Michel (1989). L'Éphémère ou la mort comme elle va. Paris: Méridiens Klincksieck. ISBN 9782865632237. OCLC 490028123.

=== Novels ===
- Arrivé, Michel (1977). Les Remembrances du vieillard idiot. Paris: Flammarion. ISBN 9782080640024. OCLC 461828897.
- Arrivé, Michel (1978). La Réduction de peine. Paris: Flammarion. ISBN 9782080641120. OCLC 5241561.
- Arrivé, Michel (1983). L'Horloge sans balancier. Paris: Flammarion. ISBN 9782080645821. OCLC 417154902.
- Arrivé, Michel (2006). Une très vieille petite fille. Seyssel: Editions Champ Vallon. ISBN 9782876734470. OCLC 421526748.
- Arrivé, Michel (2007). La Walkyrie et le professeur. Seyssel: Editions Champ Vallon. ISBN 9782876734685. OCLC 173671452.
- Arrivé, Michel (2010). Un bel immeuble. Seyssel: Editions Champ Vallon. ISBN 9782876735224. OCLC 631751867.
- Arrivé, Michel (2012). L'Homme qui achetait les rêves. Seyssel: Editions Champ Vallon. ISBN 9782876735606.
