= Alexandra Goujon =

French political scientist (born 1972)

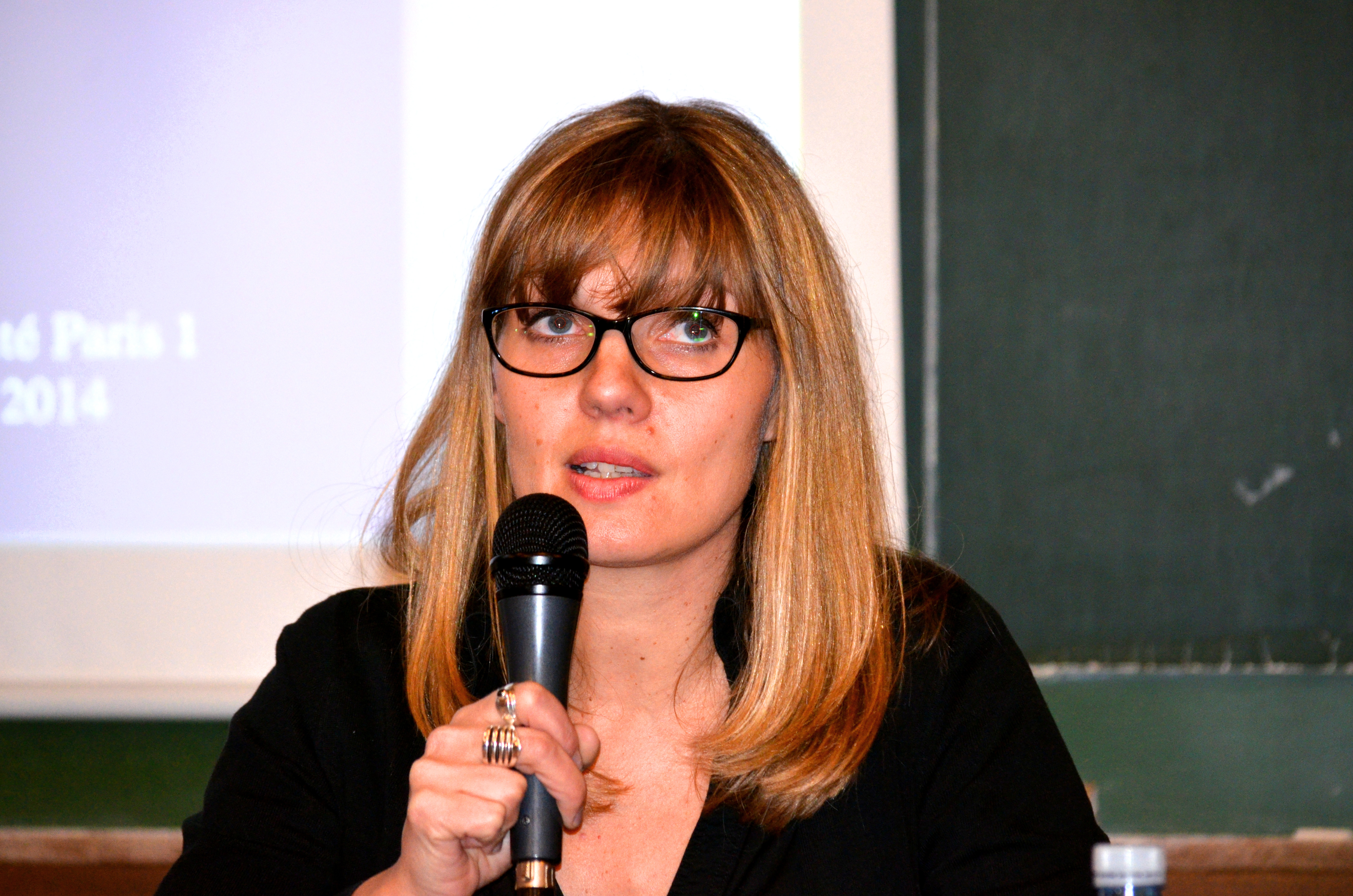
- Born: 1 June 1972 (age 54); France
- Education: University of Tours; University of Paris 1 Pantheon-Sorbonne; Sciences Po
- Scientific career
- Fields: Political science
- Workplaces: University of Burgundy; Sciences Po
- Doctoral advisor: Dominique Colas (fr)

Alexandra Goujon (born 1 June 1972) is a French political scientist. She is a professor of political science at the University of Burgundy. She specializes in political conflict and regime change in Eastern Europe, particularly Ukraine and Belarus.

== Education and early work ==
Goujon attended the University of Tours and the University of Paris 1 Pantheon-Sorbonne, where she studied economic and social administration. She obtained an MA degree in political science in 1994, also at the University of Paris 1 Pantheon-Sorbonne. She then competed one year of education in Irkutsk, and in 1996 earned a graduate studies degree (fr) in comparative studies on democratic transition in Eastern Europe from Sciences Po.

In 2001, Goujon earned a doctorate in political science under the direction of Dominique Colas (fr). Her thesis was entitled Nationalisme et démocratie à la fin de l'URSS: les fronts populaires d'Ukraine et de Biélorussie (1988-1991) (Nationalism and democracy at the end of the USSR: the popular fronts of Ukraine and Belarus 1988-1991).

== Career ==
Goujon is a political science professor at The University of Burgundy, and also holds appointments at Sciences Po in Paris and Dijon.

In 2009, Goujon published the book Révolutions politiques et identitaires en Ukraine et en Biélorussie (1988-2008) which arose from her doctoral dissertation. The academic Anna Colin Lebedev wrote that Révolutions politiques et identitaires gave a complete and precise presentation of the institutional and political evolution of Ukraine and Belarus, from the last years of the USSR. The book uses the political and geographic closeness of the two countries to study their comparative political evolutions. Andrei Stsiapanau wrote that Alexandra Goujon uses works on the USSR and its major satellites for periods that have been under-researched.

Goujon is a regular contributor to new outlets including France Culture, RTL, France Inter, and La Croix.

== Selected works ==
- Parlons biélorussien: langue et culture, with Virginie Symaniec, L'Harmattan, 2000 (ISBN 978-2-7384-5844-5)
- Chroniques sur la Biélorussie contemporaine, with Virginie Symaniec and Jean-Charles, 2001 (ISBN 978-2-7475-0341-9)
- Révolutions politiques et identitaires en Ukraine et en Biélorussie (1988-2008), Belin, 2009. (ISBN 978-2-7011-4453-5)
- Les démocraties: institutions, fonctionnements et défilés, Armand Colin, 2015. (ISBN 9782200287276)
- Les partis politiques, ateliers de la démocratie, with Dominique Andolfatto, Éditions de l'Université de Bruxelles, 2016. (ISBN 9782800416069)
