= Souleymane Mboup =

Senegalese microbiologist and HIV researcher

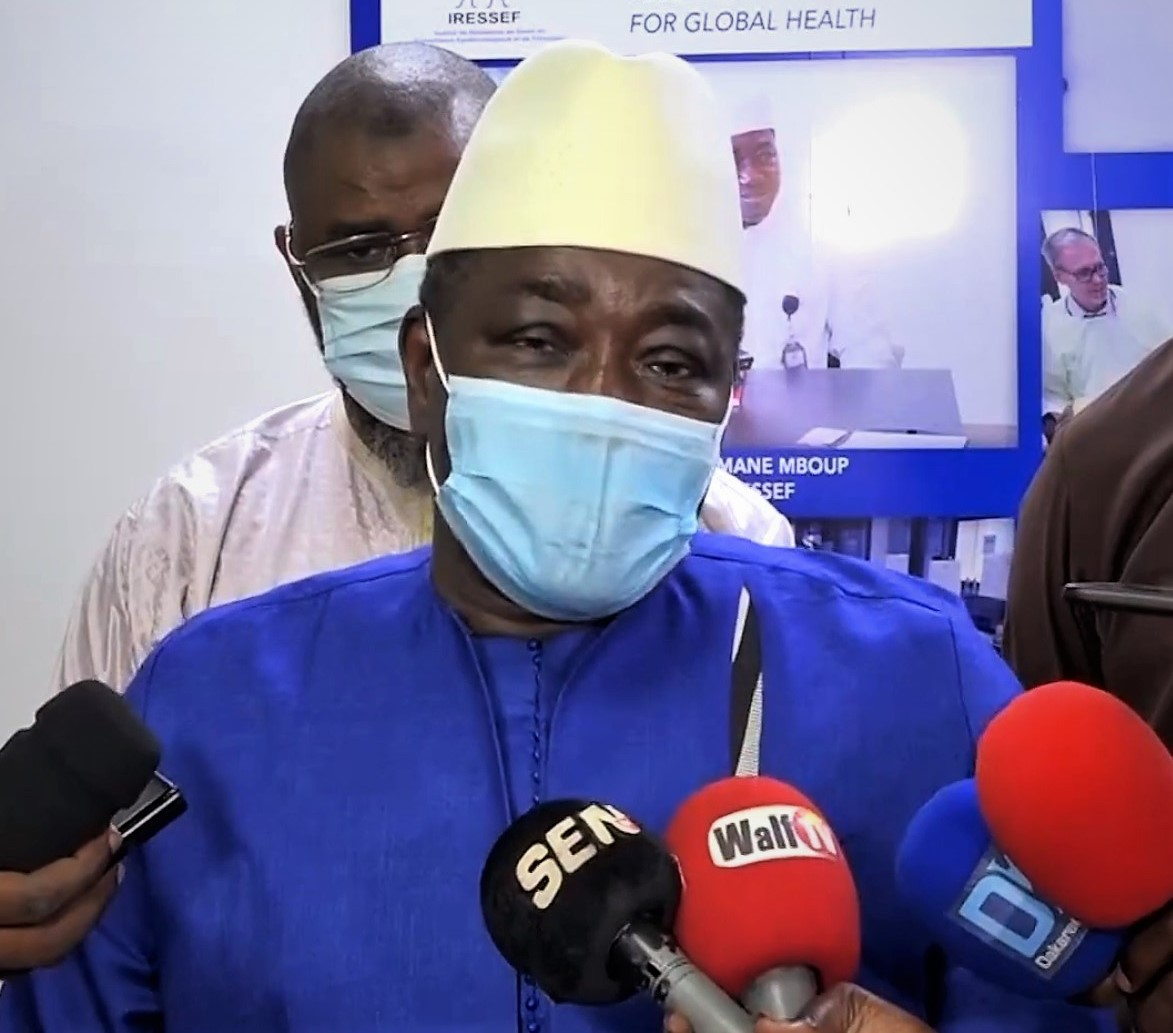
- Mboup interviewed about COVID-19 in 2020
- Born: 1951 (age 74–75); Senegal
- Other name: Souleymane M'boup
- Occupations: Microbiologist, virologist, and researcher
- Years active: 1976 to present
- Known for: Discovered and characterized HIV-2

Souleymane Mboup (born 1951) is a Senegalese microbiologist, medical researcher, and colonel in the Armed Forces of Senegal. In 1985, he was a member of the first team to identify HIV-2, a form of HIV that is typically found in West Africa and is less transmissible than the more common HIV-1. Mboup has contributed to the improvement of Senegal's research infrastructure throughout his career. Among his published works, he is known for editing the 1994 reference book AIDS in Africa. Mboup is currently the President of L'Institut de Recherche en Santé, de Surveillance Épidémiologique et de Formations (IRESSEF) in Diamniadio, Senegal.

== Education ==
Mboup earned a PharmD degree from the University of Dakar in 1976 and a MS in Immunology from the Pasteur Institute in 1981. In 1983, he received a PhD in Bacteriology Virology from Université de Tours.

== Career ==
=== Early career ===
After completing his PhD, Mboup returned to the University of Dakar's School of Medicine and Pharmacy as a professor of microbiology. Mboup focused his research on Dakar's sex workers and the sexually transmitted diseases (STDs) they contracted. He undertook this research in his laboratory at the University of Dakar.

=== Identifying HIV-2 ===
Phylogenetic tree of the SIV and HIV viruses, including HIV-2

In 1985, only two years after finishing schooling, Mboup's research of Dakar's sex workers led to a breakthrough discovery of a new type of HIV. Mboup's original collection of blood samples from Senegalese sex workers, when tested by Harvard School of Public Health's Phyllis Kanki, showed a closer relation to Simian Immunodeficiency Virus than the known HIV-1. Mboup subsequently collected new samples from the same women and transported the 30 vials of blood to the United States.

Mboup's lab at the time was ill-equipped for further research of the samples and employed only two technicians, so Mboup worked at Professor Max Essex's lab at Harvard University. Mboup's collaboration with his team and Max Essex's team led to the discovery of HIV-2, a serologically different type of HIV. The subsequent study and published report collected samples from 289 sex workers in Dakar, the capital of Senegal. Prior to the release of the study, HIV was not considered widespread in Senegal. Mboup, along with Max Essex, Phyllis Kanki, and a French colleague, presented their identification of a new type of HIV in November 1985 at the International Symposium on African AIDS in Brussels, Belgium.

=== Collaboration on HIV-2 ===
==== Origins ====
Though Mboup and his team had discovered evidence of a second immunodeficiency virus in 1985, the virus was not yet isolated or known as HIV-2. After Mboup's 1985 study, a collaboration emerged to further research this new type of virus and its affects. Mboup's team at the University of Dakar along with Harvard University, and two other French universities formed the collaboration. The goal of the institutions working together was to create a research team that was equal in its contributions. Though Mboup's laboratory was not as funded or technically advanced as Harvard University at the time, Mboup emphasized the need for an equal partnership to ensure the collaboration did not become detached from Senegal and West Africa and would instead bring research infrastructure and opportunities to Senegal.

==== Further understanding of HIV-2 ====
After the initial identification of a new type of HIV, Mboup and his team, along with the newly formed consortium, focused their research in Dakar. The goal of continued research between the collaborators was to understand the nature of this new type of HIV. Mboup and his collaborators focused on researching sex workers in Dakar over time, as this is the initial population HIV-2 had infected. As research capacity grew, Dakar's STD clinics and the sex workers who were treated at the clinics became an avenue for the team to test and track the progression and prevalence of the virus. Over time, the number of subjects involved in the consortium's research grew to include a few thousand women. The success of working at STD clinics and tracking sex workers was made possible by Senegal's laws surrounding sex work. Sex work was legalized in Senegal in 1969 and all sex workers are required to register their profession with the government and receive regular medical check ups and tests for STDs. Mboup's research with his collaborators from 1985 to 1993 led to the conclusion that HIV-2 is less virulent than HIV-1. This study was published in Science, an academic journal, in September 1994. Though Mboup is not attributed as an author of this study, he was a collaborator. Further studies through the collaboration also revealed that HIV-2 is less transmittable than HIV-1 and that women infected with HIV-2 are less likely to contract HIV-1 than those not infected. Mboup's collaboration on HIV studying Senegalese sex workers lasted over 25 years. Data collected during the collaboration not only furthered understanding of HIV, but are also used today to inform research on other infectious diseases in West Africa.

=== L'Institut de Recherche en Santé, de Surveillance Épidémiologique et de Formations (IRESSEF) ===
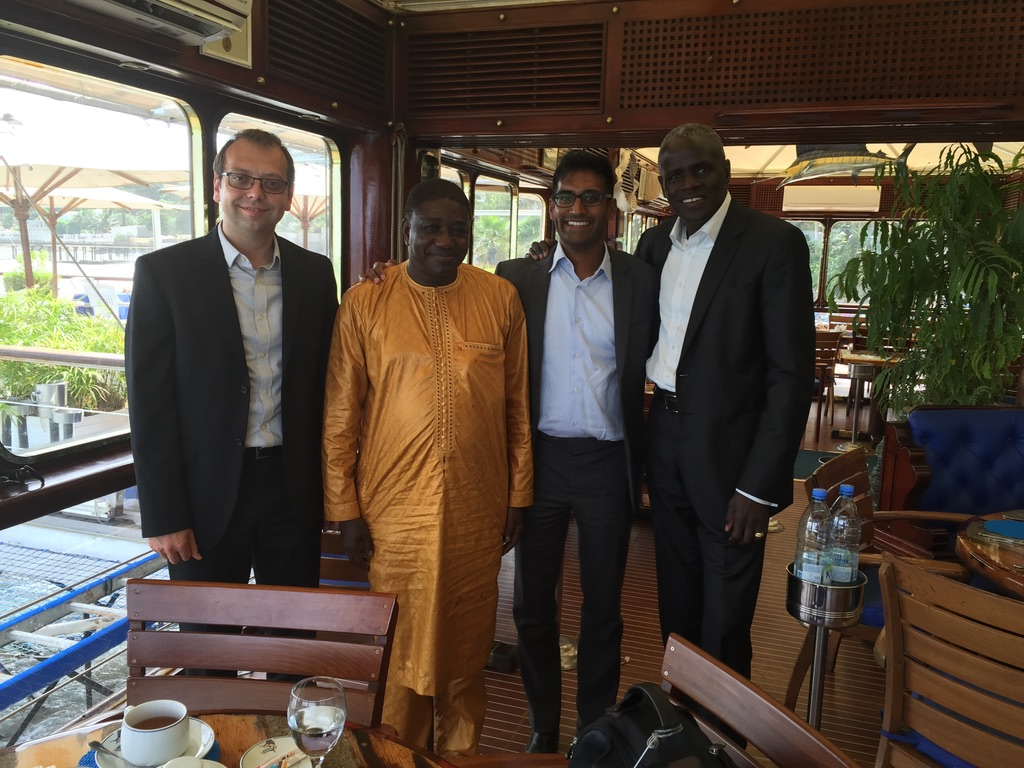
Anand Reddi, Val Marinin and Amadou Diagne of Gilead Sciences with Professor Souleymane Mboup discussing the project to build the Institut de Recherche en Santé, de Surveillance Epidémiologique et de Formation in Dakar, Senegal 2016.

In 2017, Mboup founded IRESSEF, a public research institution. IRESSEF was founded to provide cutting-edge research and training in Senegal and to position Africans among some of the world's best researchers. The organization conducts epidemiological studies and trainings with the goal of providing accessible healthcare and developing understanding of diseases in Africa. IRESSEF collaborates with the Senegalese government, other institutes and governmental organizations across Africa, and Western institutions. Recent projects include research on HIV, Ebola, Tuberculosis, and Malaria. Gilead Sciences was the main sponsor, who, alongside the State of Senegal, supported Professor Souleymane Mboup to erect and equip the IRESSEF in the new city of Diamniadio. Gilead Sciences was involved in the implementation and funding with several trips by the Gilead Sciences delegations including John C. Martin, Clifford Samuel and Anand Reddi to facilitate the health system strengthening initiatives.

=== Contributions to research infrastructure in Senegal ===
Over the course of Mboup's work on HIV-2, he prioritized increasing Senegal's research infrastructure and capabilities. In 1985, Mboup's lab only had 2 lab technicians and lacked properly functioning equipment. He was a leader in the research collaboration on HIV between the University of Dakar, Harvard University, and two other French universities. As a leader, he ensured that adequate resources were invested into Senegal's research infrastructure, as Senegal was the location of the collaboration's studies. Throughout the collaboration, Mboup worked closely with Phyllis Kanki, from Harvard University, who helped inform and develop Mboup's and other Senegalese labs' capabilities and methods to cut costs. Eventually, Mboup's lab, the Laboratory of Bacteriology and Virology at Le Dantec Hospital, grew to become one of the most well-equipped diagnostic labs in Africa, with a staff of more than 40 as of 1995.

=== Affiliations ===
In addition to his position with Dakar University, Mboup has held positions in numerous organizations throughout his career. Mboup was the Senegalese coordinator for the Inter-University Convention for Research on Human Viruses and Related Diseases. Meetings for this convention occurred in December 1986 and December 1987. Participants included Harvard University, University of Dakar, University of Tours, and University of Limonges. Mboup served as a consultant to the World Health Organization in 1987 when he was sent to Benin to conduct epidemiological research on HIV. In 1991, Mboup chaired the Sixth International Conference on AIDS in Africa. This conference consisted of over 2,000 researchers from around Africa and took place in Dakar, Senegal. In 1998, Mboup became the leader of the Senegalese AIDS Care Team at Harvard's AIDS Institute Enhancing Care Initiative. This initiative lasted for 5 years. Mboup oversaw some of Senegal's public policy initiatives to combat HIV and AIDS in the country as the leader of Senegal's AIDS Sentinel Surveillance Programme and Senegal's National AIDS Programme. Mboup has also served as president of the African AIDS' Research Network and is a former representative for Africa on the International AIDS Society's Governing Council.

== Armed Forces of Senegal ==
Mboup attended the Senegalese Military Health Training Academy and eventually rose to the rank of Colonel in the Armed Forces of Senegal. Before his retirement from the Armed Forces, Mboup served in the Civil-Military Alliance Against HIV/AIDS as a coordinator for Africa.

== Notable works ==
Mboup has written or co-written over 200 publications and 18 books. Notable works associated with Mboup's research on HIV include:

- AIDS in Africa, a comprehensive reference book
- Serological Evidence For Virus Related to Simian T-Lymphotropic Retrovirus III in Residents of West Africa, a 1985 research article published in The Lancet reporting the first serological evidence of HIV-2
- Natural Protection Against HIV-1 Infection Provided by HIV-2
- Lower Human Immunodeficiency Virus (HIV) Type 2 Viral Load Reflects the Difference in Pathogenicity of HIV-1 and HIV-2

== Awards ==
Ribbon bar of the Senegalese Order of Merit - Grand Cross

Ribbon bar of the Senegalese Order of the Lion - Knight

Ribbon bar of the Senegalese Order of Academic Palms - Knight

Mboup has received global recognition for his research and work. Notable awards include:

- 1st Award of the African AIDS Society (SAA), Dakar, 1991
- Arthur Houghton Jr. Star Crystal Award (African American Institute), New York,1994
- 1st Award of the French National Academy of Pharmacy for “Francophone Pharmacy", Paris, 2000
- Award El fasi (Francophone Universities), Belgium, 2004
- Pascoal Mocumbi Prize (EDCTP), Lisbon, 2018

Mboup has been awarded numerous National Orders in Senegal, which are some of the highest national honors for outstanding contributions to the country. In 2019, Mboup was raised to the rank of Grand Cross in Senegal's Order of Merit. This is the highest rank one can receive in the Order of Merit. He also holds the rank of Knight of the Order of Academic Palms and Knight of the National Order of the Lion.
