= Maboula Soumahoro =

French scholar and Afro-feminist

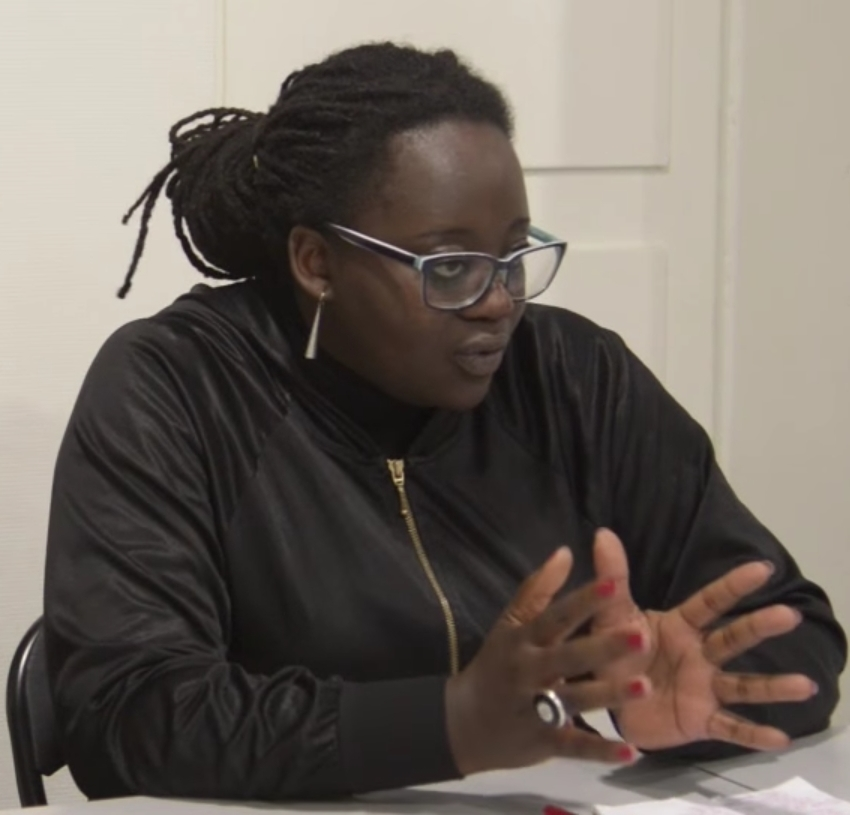
Maboula Soumahoro (2014)

Maboula Soumahoro (born 1976) is a French scholar and Afro-feminist whose parents came to France from the Ivory Coast in the late 1960s. An associate professor in the English department of the University of Tours, she specializes in studies on Afro-American diaspora and has published a paper on Rastafari. A contributor to the French committee on the history of slavery (Comité national pour la mémoire et l'histoire de l'esclavage), Soumahoro launched the French version of Black History Month in 2011. In 2020, she published Le triangle et l’hexagone inspired by her own experiences as an anti-racist black French Muslim.

== Biography ==
Born on 3 February 1976 in Paris, Maboula Soumahoro was the sixth of the family's seven children. A Muslim of Ivorian origin, after spending her early childhood in the Ivory Coast, she moved to France where she and her siblings were brought up in the working-class district of Le Kremlin-Bicêtre.

After doing well at school, she studied English at the Paris-East Créteil University where she went on to earn a master's degree in 1999 with a dissertation on The Creation of the State of Liberia. While at the Pierre and Marie Curie University, she earned a scholarship to study for a year at Columbia University, New York, where she later returned to teach. In 2008, she earned a doctorate from the University of Tours with a thesis titled La Couleur de Dieu? Regards croisés sur la Nation d'Islam et le rastafarisme 1930–1950 (The Colour of God? Overlapping Perspectives on the Nation of Islam and Rastafarianism: 1930–1950).

Over the years, Soumahoro has specialized in African and Diaspora Studies, carrying out research and teaching assignments at universities in the United States and France, including Bennington College, Barnard College, Stanford University (Paris) and Sciences Po. She has been an active member of the French committee on the history of slavery and in 2011 established the French version of Black History Month which she heads. In 2020, she published Le triangle et l’hexagone inspired by her own experiences as an anti-racist Black French Muslim. It has been translated into English as Black Is the Journey, Africana the Name.

== Works ==
- Le Triangle et l'Hexagone (La Découverte, 2020, ISBN 9782348041952)
- Black is the Journey, Africana the Name (Polity, 2021, ISBN 9781509548347)

== Career ==
- French scholar and writer
- Associate professor in the English Department of the University of Tours
- Chair and co-founder of the Black History Month association in 2013
