= Luizi crater =

Impact crater in Haut-Katanga province, Democratic Republic of the Congo

Coordinates: 10°10′00″S 28°00′00″E

- Luizi impact structure
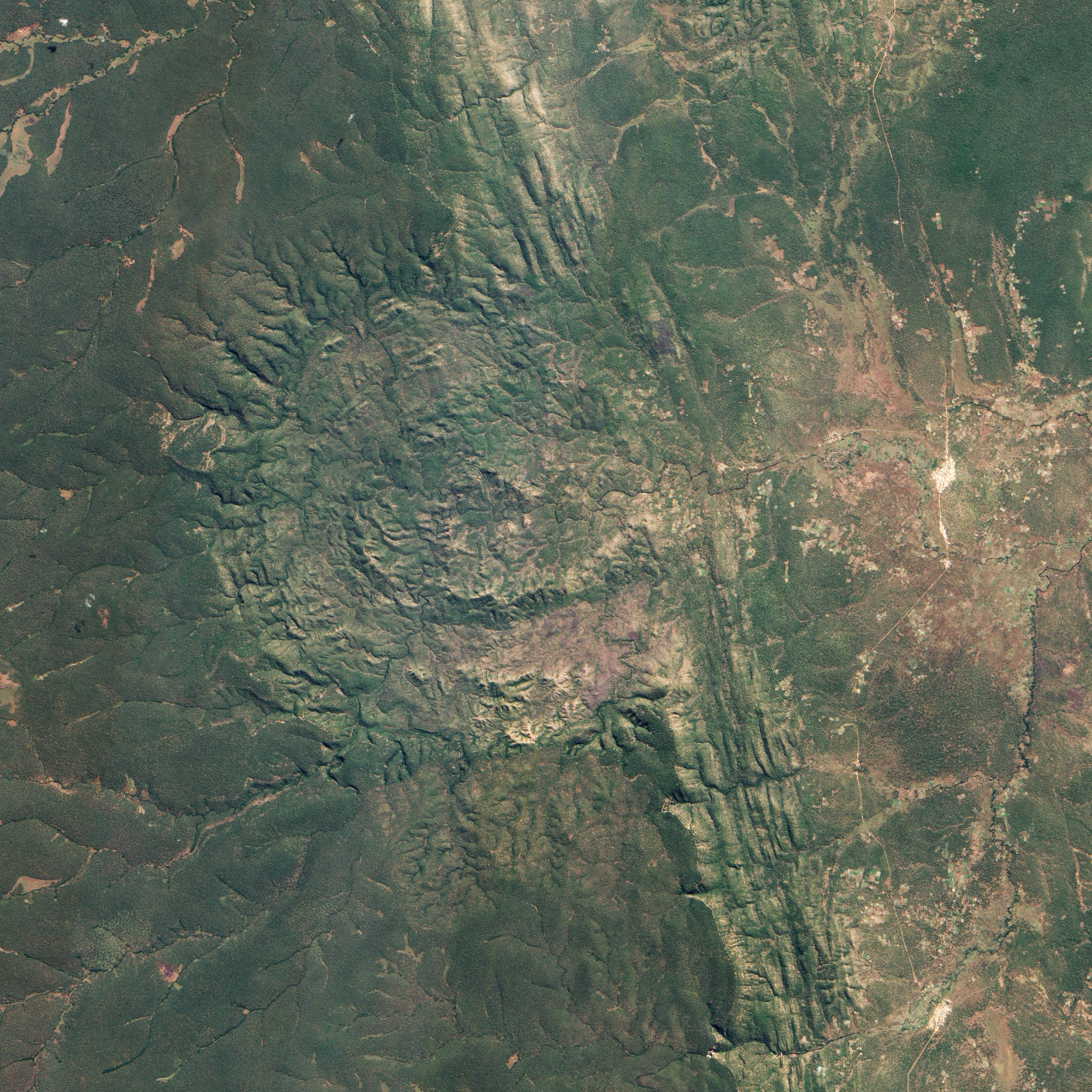
- Luizi impact crater in Democratic Republic of the Congo

- Location within Democratic Republic of the Congo
- Location: Haut-Katanga Province, Democratic Republic of the Congo

Impact crater structure
- Confidence: Confirmed
- Diameter: 17 km (11 mi)
- Age: <542 myr (basement rock age)
- Exposed: Yes
- Drilled: No

Luizi is a meteorite impact structure that lies on the Kundelungu Plateau of Haut-Katanga province, in an underexplored region of southeastern Democratic Republic of the Congo. The crater, ~17 kilometer in diameter, is visible from satellite imagery, and has been confirmed in 2011 by Ferrière et al. as being caused by a large impact event. This complex meteorite impact crater is so far the only recognized one in the Democratic Republic of the Congo and even in the whole Central Africa.

The crater was initially described as a semi-circular basin by German geologist E. Grosse in 1919.

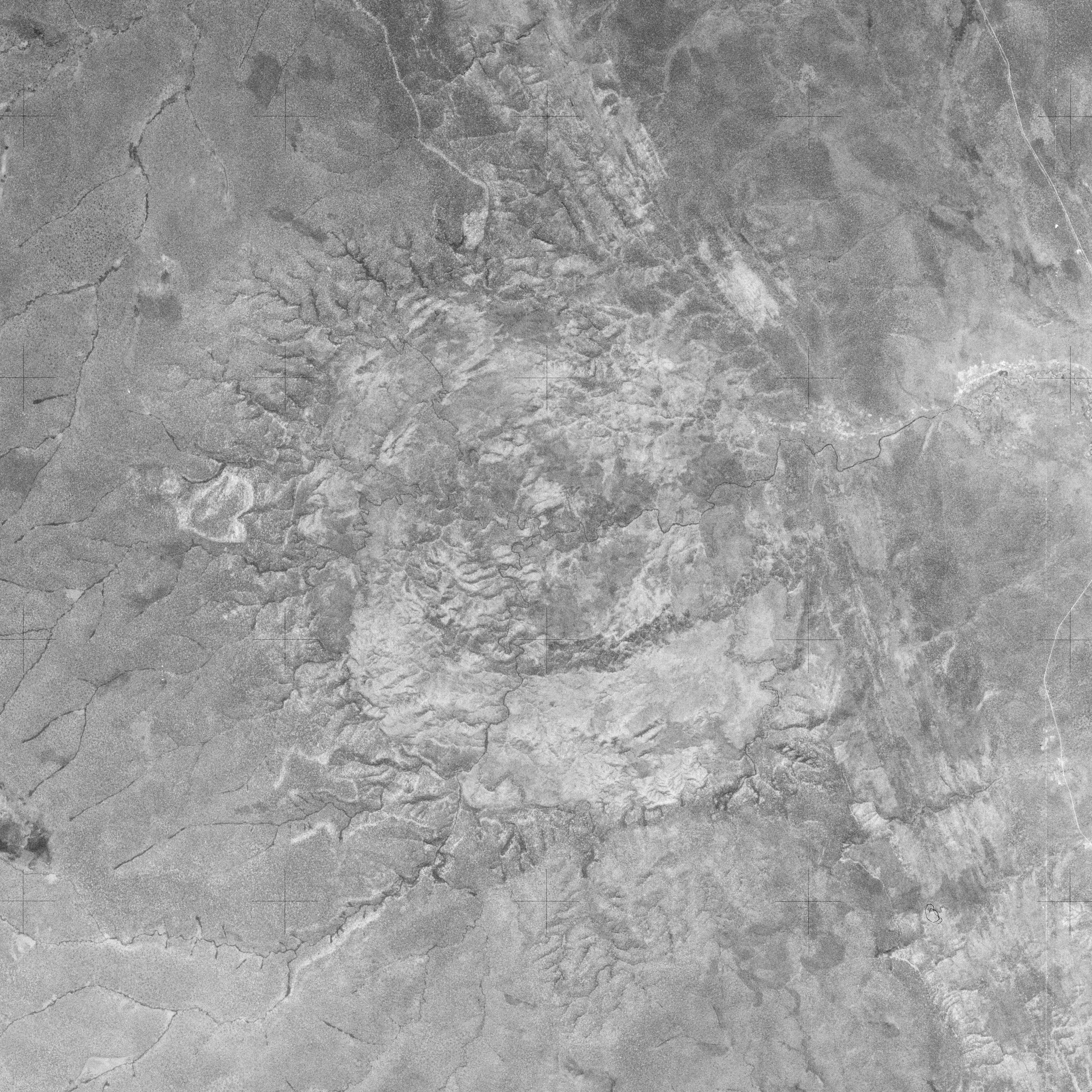
1973 satellite photo

== See also ==
- Luapula River
