= Christian Delporte =

French historian (born 1958)

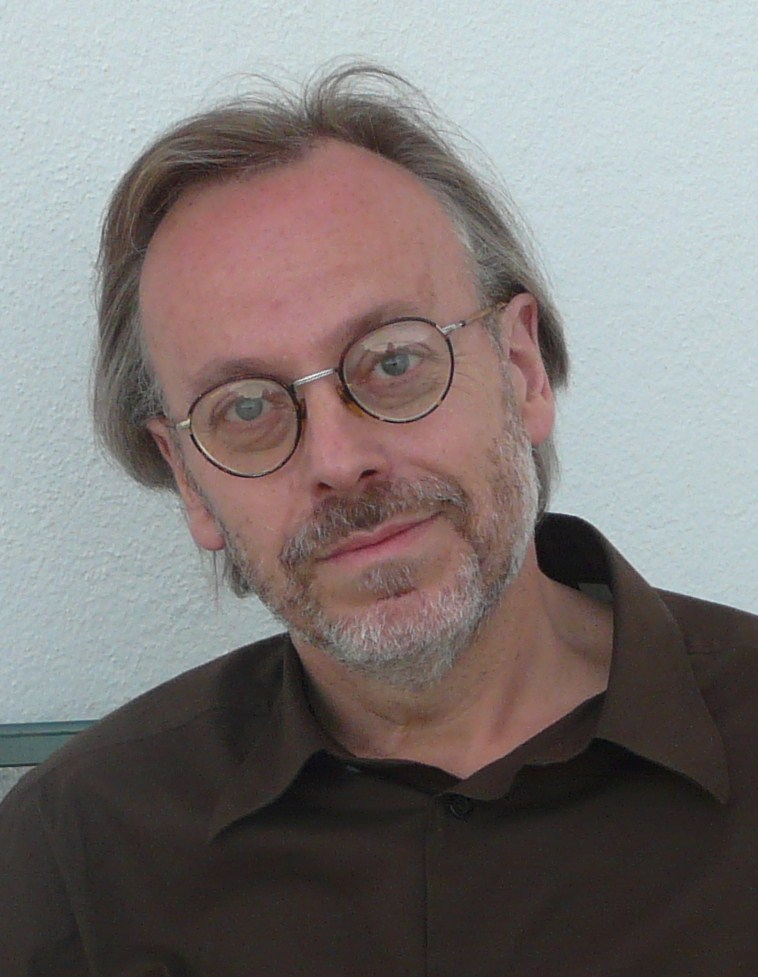
- Christian Delporte, Historian
- Born: Delporte; 1958 (age 67–68); Paris, France
- Education: Sciences Po (PhD)
- Occupation: Historian
- Employer: Versailles Saint-Quentin-en-Yvelines University

Christian Delporte (born 1958 in Paris) is a French historian specialized in political and cultural history of France in the twentieth century, including the history of media, image and political communication.

== Biography ==
Delporte earned his PhD from Sciences Po, where he was a student of René Rémond and Serge Berstein. Formerly a lecturer at François Rabelais University, he is, since 1998, professor of contemporary history at Versailles Saint-Quentin-en-Yvelines University, where he manages the Centre d'histoire culturelle des sociétés contemporaines (Center for cultural history of contemporary societies, CHCSC). Director of the Institut d'études culturelles (Institute of Cultural Studies, IEC), from 2010 to 2012, he is now vice president of the Scientific Council for research and scientific development. He also teaches media history at Sciences Po. President of the Société pour l'histoire des médias (Society for the History of Media, SPHM), he is the director of Le Temps des médias (journal specialized in History and Science Information and Communication) and member of the editorial board of the Vingtième siècle : Revue d'histoire (quarterly diary of political and cultural history founded in 1984).

Petitioner of Liberté pour l'histoire (Freedom for history), he is a member of the Board of Directors of the "éponyme" association.

== Bibliography ==
- Les Crayons de la propagande. Dessinateurs et dessin politique sous l'Occupation (Pencils propaganda. Designers and design policy under the Occupation), French National Centre for Scientific Research Éditions, Paris, 1993, 223 p. (ISBN 2-271-05014-6)
- Chancel, l'œil et la griffe, Images de la caricature (Chancel, eye and claw, images of caricature), Épinal, 1993
- Histoire du journalisme et des journalistes en France du xviie siècle à nos jours (History of journalism and journalists in France from the seventeenth century to nowadays), Presses universitaires de France, coll. « Que sais-je ? » (ISSN 0768-0066) nº 2 926, Paris, 1995, 127 p. (ISBN 2-13-040108-2)
- 3 Républiques vues par Cabrol et Sennep (3 Republics viewed by Cabrol and Sennep), with Laurent Gervereau, preface from Philippe Séguin, Bibliothèque de documentation internationale contemporaine, Paris, 1996, 312 p. (ISBN 2-901658-55-5)
- Intellectuels et politique au xxe siècle (Intellectuals and politics in the twentieth century), Casterman (ISSN 1248-4881), Tournai, 1995, 127 p. (ISBN 2-203-61021-2).
- La IIIe République, vol. 3 De Raymond Poincaré à Paul Reynaud (1919-1940) (The Third Republic, vol. 3, From Raymond Poincaré to Paul Reynaud (1919-1940)), Pygmalion and Gérard Watelet, Paris, 1998, 426 p. (ISBN 2-85704-558-1).
- Les Journalistes en France (1880-1950). Naissance et construction d'une profession (Journalists in France (1880-1950). Birth and construction of a profession), Éditions du Seuil (ISSN 0986-1114), Paris, 1999, 449 p. (ISBN 2-02-023509-9).
- Médias et villes (XVIIIe-XXe siècle) (Media and cities (eighteenth-century)), CEHVI, Presses universitaires de Tours, 1996.
- Presse à scandale, scandale de presse (Tabloids, scandal press), (with Michael Palmer and Denis Ruellan), Paris, L'Harmattan, 2001.
- Jules Roy : un engagement (Jules Roy : a commitment), (with Patrick Facon and Jeannine Lepesant-Hayat), octobre 2001, Paris, SHAA-UVSQ, 2002.
- L'Evénement. Image, représentation, mémoire (The Event. Image, representation, memory), (with Annie Duprat), Grâne, Créaphis, 2003.
- Histoire des médias en France de la Grande Guerre à nos jours (Media history in France from the Great War to nowadays), with Fabrice d'Almeida, Flammarion (ISSN 1622-6135), Paris, 2003, 434 (ISBN 2-08-083029-5).
- « L'Humanité » de Jaurès à nos jours (L'Humanité » from Jaurès to nowadays), (with Claude Pennetier, Jean-François Sirinelli, Serge Wolikow), Paris, Nouveau-Monde Editions, 2004.
- Images et politique en France au xxe siècle (Images and politics in France in the twentieth century), Nouveau Monde Éditions, Paris, 2006, 488 p. (ISBN 2-84736-179-0).
- Les médias et la Libération 1945-2005 (Media and the Liberation 1945-2005), (with Denis Marechal), Paris, INA-L'Harmattan, 2006.
- La France dans les yeux. Une histoire de la communication politique de 1930 à nos jours (France in the eyes. A history of political communication from 1930 to nowadays), Flammarion, Paris, 2007, 490 p. (ISBN 978-2-08-210329-9).
- L'Indignation. Histoire d'une émotion politique, XIXe-XXe siècles (The Indignation. History of a political emotion, nineteenth and twentieth centuries), (with Anne-Claude Ambroise-Rendu), Paris, Nouveau-Monde Editions, 2008.
- Quelle est la place des images en histoire ? (What is the role of images in history?), (with Denis Maréchal and Laurent Gervereau), Paris, Nouveau-Monde Editions, 2008.
- Une histoire de la langue de bois (A history of waffling), Paris, Flammarion, 2009, 352 p. (ISBN 978-2081219939).
- « La guerre après la guerre ». Images et construction des imaginaires de guerre dans l'Europe du xxe siècle ("The war after the war". Images and construction of imaginary war in Europe in the twentieth century), (with Denis Maréchal, Caroline Moine, Isabelle Veyrat-Massion), Paris, Nouveau-Monde éditions, 2010.
- Dictionnaire d'histoire culturelle de la France contemporaine (Cultural history dictionary of contemporary France), with Jean-Yves Mollier and Jean-François Sirinelli, PUF, « Quadrige dicos poche », Paris, 2010, 928 p. (ISBN 978-2130561088).
- Une histoire de la séduction politique (A history of political seduction), Flammarion, Paris, 2011, 377 p. (ISBN 978-2-08-121245-9)
- Images et sons de mai 68 (1968-2008) (Images and sounds of May 68 (1968-2008)), (with Denis Maréchal, Caroline Moine, Isabelle Veyrat-Masson), Paris, Nouveau-Monde Editions, 2011.
- Les grands débats politiques. Ces émissions qui ont fait l'opinion (Major political debates. These programs which have formed the opinion), Paris, Flammarion, 2012.
