= Subtypes of HIV =

Human immunodeficiency viruses
- Phylogenetic tree of the SIV and HIVs

Scientific classification
- (unranked): Virus
- Realm: Riboviria
- Kingdom: Pararnavirae
- Phylum: Artverviricota
- Class: Revtraviricetes
- Order: Ortervirales
- Family: Retroviridae
- Subfamily: Orthoretrovirinae
- Genus: Lentivirus

Groups included
- Human immunodeficiency virus 1; Human immunodeficiency virus 2

Cladistically included but traditionally excluded taxa
- Simian immunodeficiency virus (subgroups i, ii)

Variants of the human immunodeficiency virus

There are two main subtypes of HIV, known as HIV type 1 (HIV-1) and HIV type 2 (HIV-2). These subtypes have distinct genetic differences and are associated with different epidemiological patterns and clinical characteristics.

HIV-1 exhibits a genetic relation to viruses indigenous to chimpanzees and gorillas that inhabit West Africa, while HIV-2 viruses are affiliated with viruses present in the sooty mangabey, a vulnerable West African primate.

HIV-1 viruses can be further stratified into groups M, N, O, and P. Among these, HIV-1 group M viruses are the most prevalent, infecting nearly 90% of people living with HIV and are responsible for the global AIDS pandemic. Group M can be further subdivided into subtypes based on genetic sequence data. Certain subtypes are known for their increased virulence or drug resistance to different medications used to treat HIV.

HIV-2 viruses are generally considered to be less virulent and less transmissible than HIV-1 M group viruses, although HIV-2 is also known to still cause AIDS.

One of the prevailing challenges in the pursuit of effective management of HIV is the virus's pronounced genetic variability and rapid viral evolution.

== Major types ==
=== HIV-1 ===
HIV-1 is the most common and most pathogenic strain of the virus. As of 2022, approximately 1.3 million such infections occur annually. Scientists divide HIV-1 into a major group (group M) and two or more minor groups, namely groups N, O and possibly a group P. Each group is believed to represent an independent transmission of simian immunodeficiency virus (SIV) into humans, excluding subtypes within a specific group. The complete genome sequence of HIV-1 contains a total of 39 open reading frames (ORFs) across all six possible reading frames (RFs), but only a few of them are functional.

==== Group M ====
With 'M' for "major", this is by far the most common type of HIV, with more than 90% of HIV/AIDS cases caused by infection with HIV-1 group M viruses. This major HIV, which was the source of pre-1960 pandemic viruses, originated in the 1920s in Léopoldville, the Belgian Congo, today known as Kinshasa, which is now the capital of the Democratic Republic of Congo (DRC). Its zoonotic origin is the SIVcpz strain, which infects chimpanzees. The M group is subdivided further into clades, called subtypes, that are also given a letter. There are also "circulating recombinant forms" or CRFs derived from genetic recombination between viruses of different subtypes which are in addition each given a number. CRF12_BF, for example, is a recombination between subtypes B and F.

- Subtype A is common in parts of eastern Africa, Russia, and former Soviet states.
- Subtype B is the dominant form in Europe, the Americas, Japan, and Australia. In addition, subtype B is the most common form in the Middle East and North Africa. It may have been exported from Africa when Haitian professionals visited Kinshasa in the 1960s and brought it to Haiti in 1964.
- Subtype C is the dominant form in Southern Africa, Eastern Africa, India, Nepal, and parts of China.
- Subtype D is generally only seen in Eastern and Central Africa.
- Subtype E was originally used to describe a strain that is now accounted for as the combined strain CRF01_AE. This means the original, singular, E strain has disappeared, but we know it existed, as it is visible in this combined strain form.
- Subtype F has been found in central Africa, South America, and Eastern Europe.
- Subtype G (and the CRF02_AG) have been found in Africa and central Europe.
- Subtype H is limited to central Africa.
- Subtype I was originally used to describe a strain that is now accounted for as CRF04_cpx, with the cpx short for "complex" recombination of several subtypes.
- Subtype J is primarily found in North, Central, and West Africa, and the Caribbean
- Subtype K is limited to the DRC and Cameroon.
- Subtype L is limited to the DRC.

The spatial movement of these subtypes moved along the railways and waterways of the DRC from Kinshasa to these other areas. These subtypes are sometimes further split into sub-subtypes such as A1 and A2 or F1 and F2. In 2015, the HIV strain CRF19, a recombinant of subtype A, subtype D, and subtype G, with a subtype D protease, was found to be strongly associated with rapid progression to AIDS in Cuba. This is not thought to be a complete or final list, and further types are likely to be found.

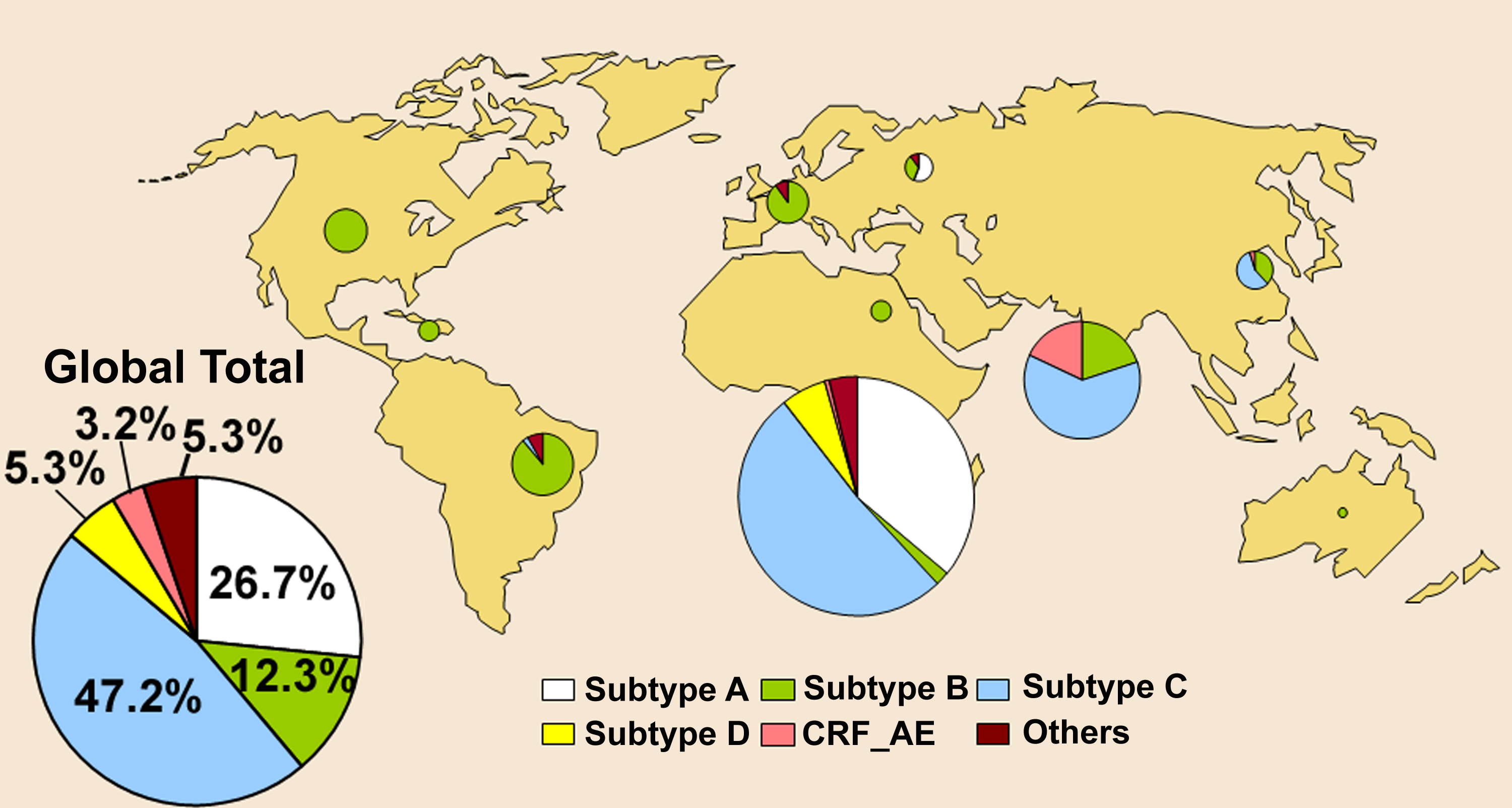
HIV-1 subtype prevalence in 2002

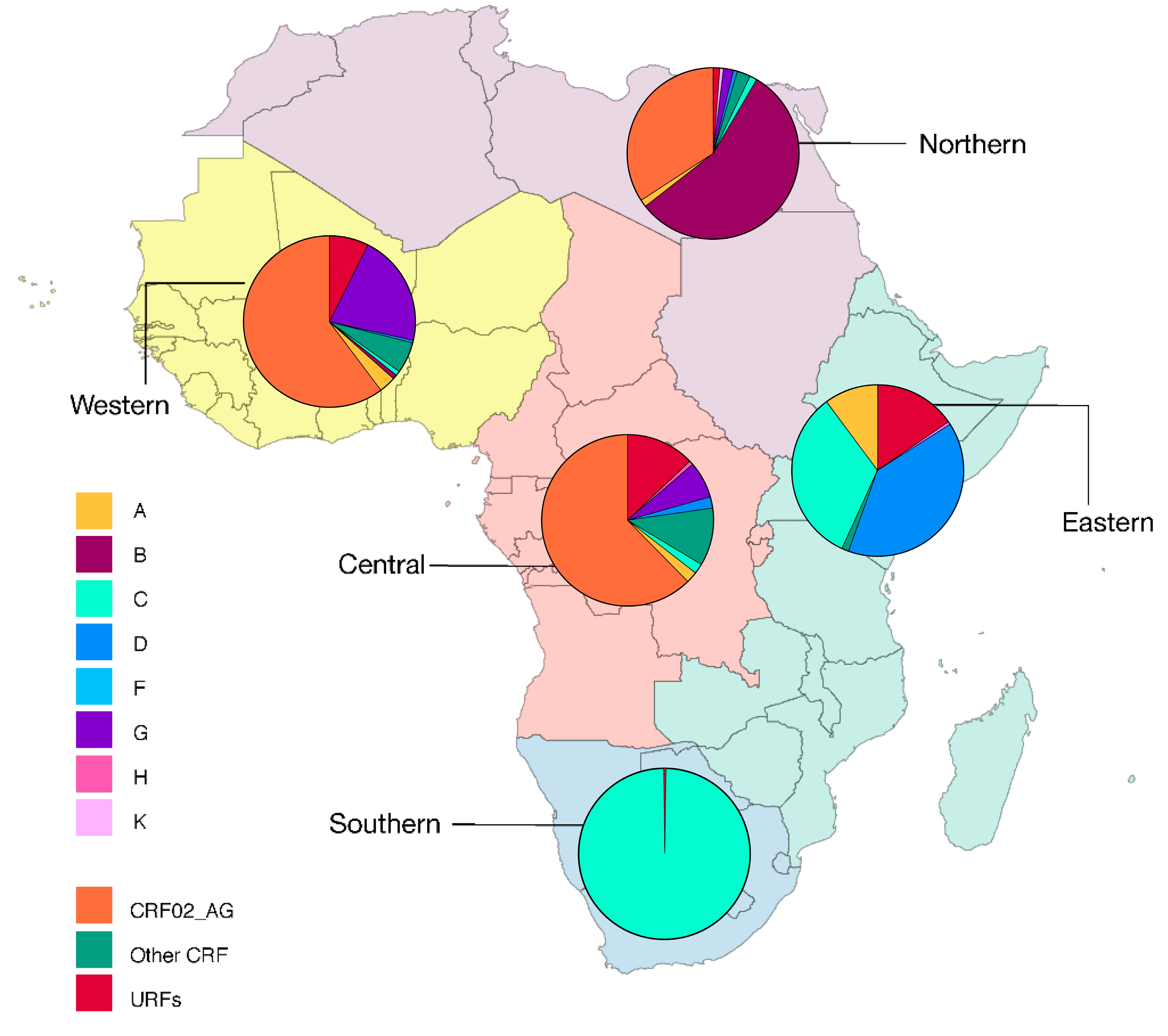
Geographic distribution of HIV-1 subtypes, Circulating Recombinant Forms (CRFs), and Unique Recombinant Forms (URFs) in Africa, 2015–2020

==== Group N ====
The 'N' stands for "non-M, non-O". This group was discovered by a Franco-Cameroonian team in 1998, when they identified and isolated the HIV-1 variant strain YBF380 from a Cameroonian woman who died of AIDS in 1995. When tested, the YBF380 variant reacted with a viral envelope antigen from SIVcpz rather than with those of Group M or Group O, indicating it was indeed a novel strain of HIV-1. As of 2015, fewer than 20 Group N infections have been recorded.

==== Group O ====
The O ("Outlier") group has infected about 100,000 individuals located in West-Central Africa and is not usually seen outside of that area. It is reportedly most common in Cameroon, where a 1997 survey found that about 2% of HIV-positive samples were from Group O. Its zoonotic origin is SIVgor, which infects gorillas (rather than the more common source, SIVcpz). The group caused some concern because it could not be detected by early versions of the HIV-1 test kits. More advanced HIV tests have now been developed to detect both Group O and Group N.

==== Group P ====
In 2009, a newly analyzed HIV sequence was reported to have greater similarity to SIVgor, than SIVcpz. The virus had been isolated from a Cameroonian woman residing in France who was diagnosed with HIV-1 infection in 2004. The scientists reporting this sequence placed it in a proposed Group P "pending the identification of further human cases".

=== HIV-2 ===
HIV-2 is mostly found in Africa, and therefore less recognized elsewhere in the world.

==== History ====
HIV-2 was first identified by microbiologist Souleymane Mboup and his collaborators in 1985. At the time of the discovery, little data existed about HIV in Africa. Mboup began to test for the virus in Senegal. Some of his samples tested positive, but they did not produce a GP41 band on Western Blot analysis. So, Mboup sent the samples to colleagues in France and at Harvard Medical School to confirm the result. The samples were then confirmed to be a strain of virus distinct from HIV-1.

The first case in the United States was in 1987. The first confirmed case of HIV-2 was a Portuguese man who was treated at the London Hospital for Tropical Diseases and later died in 1987. He was believed to have been exposed to the disease in Guinea-Bissau, where he lived between 1956 and 1966. His pathological diagnosis at the time was cryptosporidiosis and enterovirus infection, but an analysis of his stored serum in 1987 found that he was infected with HIV-2.

HIV-2 is closely related to SIV endemic in sooty mangabeys (Cercocebus atys atys) (SIVsmm), a monkey species inhabiting the forests of Littoral West Africa. Phylogenetic analyses show that the virus most closely related to the two strains of HIV-2 which spread considerably in humans (HIV-2 groups A and B) is the SIVsmm found in the sooty mangabeys of the Tai forest, in western Ivory Coast. The virus is thought to have made the zoonotic jump from sooty mangabeys to humans in the early 1940s.

==== Subgroups ====
There are eight known HIV-2 groups, designated A to H. Of these, only groups A and B are pandemic. Group A is found mainly in West Africa, but has also spread to Angola, Mozambique, Brazil, India, Europe, and the US. Despite the presence of HIV-2 globally, Group B is mainly confined to West Africa.

There are six additional known HIV-2 groups, each having been found in just one person. They all seem to derive from independent transmissions from sooty mangabeys to humans. Groups C and D have been found in two people from Liberia, groups E and F have been discovered in two people from Sierra Leone, and groups G and H have been detected in two people from the Ivory Coast. Each of these HIV-2 strains, for which humans are probably dead-end hosts, is most closely related to SIVsmm strains from sooty mangabeys living in the same country where the human infection was found.

==== Diagnosis ====
HIV-2 diagnosis can be made when a patient has no symptoms but positive blood work indicating the individual has HIV. Many test kits for HIV-1 will also detect HIV-2. The Multispot HIV-1/HIV-2 Rapid Test is currently the only FDA approved method for such differentiation between the two viruses. Recommendations for the screening and diagnosis of HIV has always been to use enzyme immunoassays that detect HIV-1, HIV-1 group O, and HIV-2. When screening the combination, if the test is positive followed by an indeterminate HIV-1 western blot, a follow-up test, such as amino acid testing, must be performed to distinguish which infection is present. A differential diagnosis of HIV-2 should be considered when a person is of West African descent or has had sexual contact or shared needles with such a person.

==== Treatments ====
HIV-2 has been found to be less pathogenic than HIV-1. The mechanism of HIV-2 is not clearly defined, nor the difference from HIV-1, however, the transmission rate is much lower in HIV-2 than HIV-1. Both viruses can lead to AIDS in infected individuals and both can mutate to develop drug resistance. Disease monitoring in patients with HIV-2 includes clinical evaluation and CD4 cell counts, while treatment includes anti-retroviral therapy (ART), nucleoside reverse transcriptase inhibitors (NRTIs), protease inhibitors (PI), and non-nucleoside reverse transcriptase inhibitors (NNRTIs) with the addition of CCR5 co-receptor antagonists and fusion inhibitors.

Choice of initial and/or second-line therapy for HIV-2 has not yet been defined. HIV-2 appears to be resistant to NNRTIs intrinsically, but may be sensitive to NRTIs, though the mechanism is poorly understood. Protease inhibitors have shown variable effect, while integrase inhibitors are also being evaluated. Combination regimens of the above listed therapies are being looked into as well, also showing variable effect depending on the types of therapies combined. While the mechanisms are not clearly understood for HIV-1 and HIV-2, it is known that they use different pathways and patterns, making the algorithms used to evaluate HIV-1 resistance-associated mutations irrelevant to HIV-2.

Each virus can be contracted individually, or they can be contracted together in what is referred to as co-infection. HIV-2 seems to have lower mortality rates, less severe symptoms and slower progression to AIDS than HIV-1 alone or the co-infection. In co-infection, however, this is largely dependent on which virus was contracted first. HIV-1 tends to out compete HIV-2 for disease progression. Co-infection seems to be a growing problem globally as time progresses, with most cases being identified in West African countries, as well as some cases in the USA. A study found that individuals who contract HIV-2 before HIV-1 tend to have a slower rate of disease progression, suggesting that the immune response to HIV-2 may limit the proliferation of HIV-1.

==== Pregnancy ====
If a pregnant mother is exposed, screening is performed as normal. If HIV-2 is present, a number of perinatal ART drugs may be given as a prophylactic to lower the risk of mother-to-child transmission. After the child is born, a standard six-week regimen of these prophylactics should be initiated. Breast milk may also contain viral particles of HIV-2; therefore, breastfeeding is strictly advised against.

== Evolution ==
The rapid evolution of HIV can be attributed to its high mutation rate. During the early stages of mutation, evolution appears to be neutral due to the absence of an evolutionary response. However, when examining the virus in several different individuals, convergent mutations can be found appearing in these viral populations independently.

HIV evolution within a host influences factors including the virus' set-point viral load. If the virus has a low set-point viral load, the host will live longer, and there is a greater probability that the virus will be transmitted to another individual. If the virus has a high set-point viral load, the host will live for a shorter amount of time and there is a lower probability that the virus will be transmitted to another individual. HIV has evolved to maximize the number of infections to other hosts, and this tendency for selection to favor intermediate strains shows that HIV undergoes stabilizing selection.

The virus has also evolved to become more infectious between hosts. There are three different mechanisms that allow HIV to evolve at a population level. One includes the continuous battle to evolve and overcome the immune system which slows down the evolution of HIV and shifts the virus’ focus towards a population level. Another includes the slow evolution of viral load due to viral load mutations being neutral within the host. The last mechanism focuses on the virus' preference to transmit founding viral strains stored during the early stages of infection. This preference of the virus to transmit its stored genome copies explains why HIV evolves more quickly within the host than between hosts.

HIV is evolving toward a milder form, but it is still "an awfully long way" from no longer being deadly, with severe variants still appearing.

== See also ==
- HIV Drug Resistance Database
- HIV superinfection
- History of HIV/AIDS
- Epidemiology of HIV/AIDS
- Timeline of HIV/AIDS
- HIV/AIDS research
- Discovery and development of CCR5 receptor antagonists
