= VIR-576 =

- VIR-576 3D

Clinical data
- Pregnancy category: Unknown
- ATC code: J05AX (WHO)

Legal status
- Legal status: Under clinical trials

Identifiers
- PubChem CID: 16729392
- ChemSpider: 20561003
- NIAID ChemDB: 472841
- CompTox Dashboard (EPA): DTXSID901045684

Chemical and physical data
- Formula: C_{224}H_{322}N_{42}O_{51}S_{2}
- Molar mass: 4483.40 g·mol^{−1}
- 3D model (JSmol): Interactive image
- SMILES: CC[C@H](C)[C@H]1C(=O)N2CCC[C@H]2C(=O)N[C@@H](CSSC[C@@H](C(=O)N[C@H](C(=O)N[C@H](C(=O)N3CCC[C@H]3C(=O)N4CCC[C@H]4C(=O)N[C@H](C(=O)N[C@H](C(=O)N[C@H](C(=O)N[C@H](C(=O)NCC(=O)N[C@H](C(=O)N5CCC[C@H]5C(=O)N[C@H](C(=O)N[C@H](C(=O)N[C@H](C(=O)N[C@H](C(=O)N[C@H](C(=O)N[C@H](C(=O)N1)C)CCC(=O)O)CC(C)C)Cc6ccccc6)C(C)C)Cc7ccccc7)CCCCN)Cc8ccccc8)CC(C)C)Cc9ccccc9)CCC(=O)O)[C@@H](C)CC)CO)NC(=O)[C@@H]1CCCN1C(=O)[C@H]([C@@H](C)CC)NC(=O)[C@H](C)NC(=O)[C@H](CCC(=O)O)NC(=O)[C@H](CC(C)C)N)C(=O)N[C@@H](CO)C(=O)N[C@@H]([C@@H](C)CC)C(=O)N1CCC[C@H]1C(=O)N1CCC[C@H]1C(=O)N[C@@H](CCC(=O)O)C(=O)N[C@@H](Cc1ccccc1)C(=O)N[C@@H](CC(C)C)C(=O)N[C@@H](Cc1ccccc1)C(=O)NCC(=O)N[C@@H](CCCCN)C(=O)N1CCC[C@H]1C(=O)N[C@@H](Cc1ccccc1)C(=O)N[C@@H](C(C)C)C(=O)N[C@@H](Cc1ccccc1)C(=O)O
- InChI: InChI=1S/C224H322N42O51S2/c1-23-131(17)183(255-187(279)135(21)230-192(284)146(89-93-177(271)272)234-189(281)145(227)107-125(5)6)220(312)263-103-59-85-171(263)212(304)251-165-123-318-319-124-166(207(299)250-164(122-268)205(297)258-186(134(20)26-4)223(315)266-106-62-88-174(266)219(311)262-102-58-84-170(262)209(301)237-149(92-96-180(277)278)195(287)244-158(114-140-69-41-30-42-70-140)200(292)240-154(110-128(11)12)198(290)242-156(112-138-65-37-28-38-66-138)191(283)229-120-176(270)233-151(80-52-54-98-226)217(309)260-100-56-82-168(260)211(303)246-161(117-143-75-47-33-48-76-143)203(295)254-182(130(15)16)215(307)248-162(224(316)317)118-144-77-49-34-50-78-144)252-213(305)172-86-60-104-264(172)221(313)184(132(18)24-2)256-188(280)136(22)231-193(285)147(90-94-178(273)274)235-196(288)152(108-126(7)8)238-201(293)159(115-141-71-43-31-44-72-141)247-214(306)181(129(13)14)253-202(294)160(116-142-73-45-32-46-74-142)245-210(302)167-81-55-99-259(167)216(308)150(79-51-53-97-225)232-175(269)119-228-190(282)155(111-137-63-35-27-36-64-137)241-197(289)153(109-127(9)10)239-199(291)157(113-139-67-39-29-40-68-139)243-194(286)148(91-95-179(275)276)236-208(300)169-83-57-101-261(169)218(310)173-87-61-105-265(173)222(314)185(133(19)25-3)257-204(296)163(121-267)249-206(165)298/h27-50,63-78,125-136,145-174,181-186,267-268H,23-26,51-62,79-124,225-227H2,1-22H3,(H,228,282)(H,229,283)(H,230,284)(H,231,285)(H,232,269)(H,233,270)(H,234,281)(H,235,288)(H,236,300)(H,237,301)(H,238,293)(H,239,291)(H,240,292)(H,241,289)(H,242,290)(H,243,286)(H,244,287)(H,245,302)(H,246,303)(H,247,306)(H,248,307)(H,249,298)(H,250,299)(H,251,304)(H,252,305)(H,253,294)(H,254,295)(H,255,279)(H,256,280)(H,257,296)(H,258,297)(H,271,272)(H,273,274)(H,275,276)(H,277,278)(H,316,317)/t131-,132-,133-,134-,135-,136-,145-,146-,147-,148-,149-,150-,151-,152-,153-,154-,155-,156-,157-,158-,159-,160-,161-,162-,163-,164-,165-,166-,167-,168-,169-,170-,171-,172-,173-,174-,181-,182-,183-,184-,185-,186-/m0/s1; Key:QMLQPHUSDUODMB-MFQMBSFASA-N

VIR-576 is an experimental drug that is under clinical trials for the treatment of HIV-1 infections. VIR-576 is synthetic peptide that binds to HIV-1's hydrophobic fusion peptide gp41, preventing the virus from inserting itself into a host cell's membrane to initiate an infection. This drug is a synthesized variant of a highly specific natural entry inhibitor designated as VIRIP (virus-inhibitory peptide).

The design of VIR-576 was based on VIRIP which in turn was discovered in 2007 by Frank Kirchhoff and coworkers. This product is being developed by VIRO Pharmaceuticals GmbH & Co. KG.

== Origins and development ==
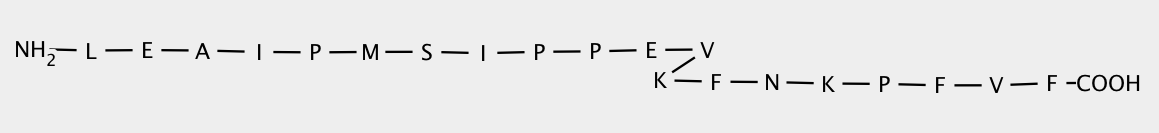
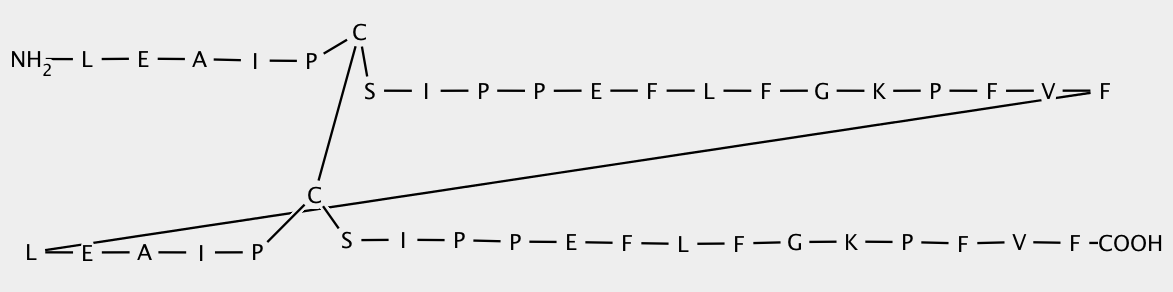
Comparison between VIRIP (left) and VIR-576 (right) primary structures

In 2007, a new natural peptide was discovered in the human organism and was called VIRIP. It is generated from alpha-1-antitrypsin, a protease inhibitor that belongs to the serine family, by matrix metalloproteinases. It was shown that it could interact with the HIV-1 and stop the virus multiplication. In spite of interacting in a highly intensity with gp-41, the VIRIP did not prevent the multiplication of the virus. So, it was decided to increase the efficacy of this molecule creating other ones that could be more powerful. Among these 600 created molecules, there was the VIR-576 which was synthesized using the solid-phase peptide synthesis method. Moreover, another molecule was used to protect the amino groups, the fluorenylmethyloxycarbonyl chloride. The next step was the purification before lyophilizing it with mannitol. Other peptides were made such as the VIR-353 or the VIR-449.

== Structure ==
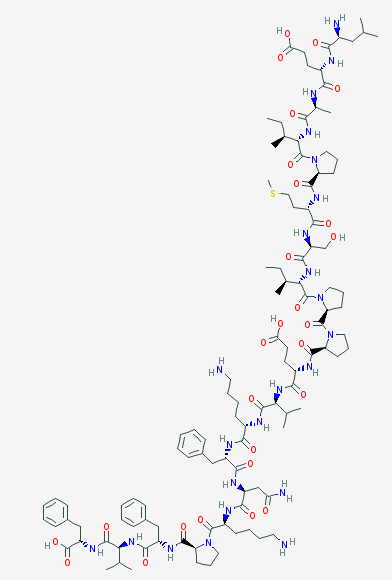
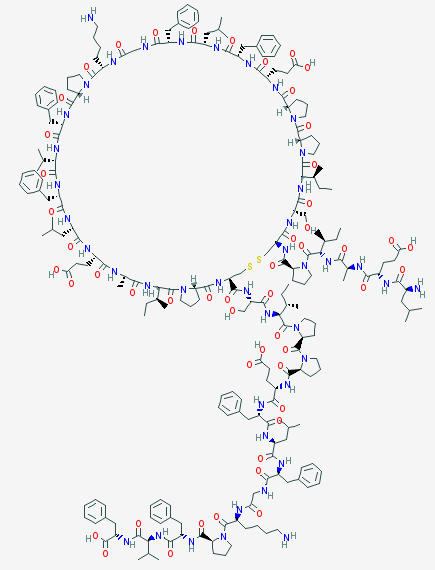
Appearance of the secondary structures of VIRIP (left) and VIR-576 (right)

The VIR-576 is a peptide. Consequently, it is a molecule formed by a sequence of amino-acids united by peptide bonds. If we compare both primary structures, it can be seen that the VIR-576 has 2 subunits. Each subunit, monomer is a variant form, a mutant of the VIRIP, differing from four amino acids.

Thus, among the new ones introduced, it is important to emphasize the importance of the cysteine (C) introduced replacing the methionine (M), both being sulfated amino acids, in the stabilization of its structure.

VIR-576 can establish more hydrogen bonds because it has 41 H-bond donors and 56 H-bond acceptors in comparison with the 23 H-bond donors and 30 H-bond acceptors of the VIRIP.Therefore, it's able to form more interactions and react with the gp-41 in a higher intensity than the VIRIP.

Another important interaction that we must underline is the disulfide bond established between both cysteines of the two monomers of the VIR-576 which allows the peptide to have more structural stability in the space in comparison with the VIRIP. Moreover, the ring form that appears in the secondary structure is due to this interaction between both sulfate atoms. Thanks to this disulfide bond, a cystine is formed. This fact allows the union of the subunits during the reaction with the gp41 and also allows them to act simultaneously. Thanks to all this activity and to the dimerization respect to the VIRIP, the VIR-576 is more effective.

== Pharmacology ==
=== Mechanism of action ===
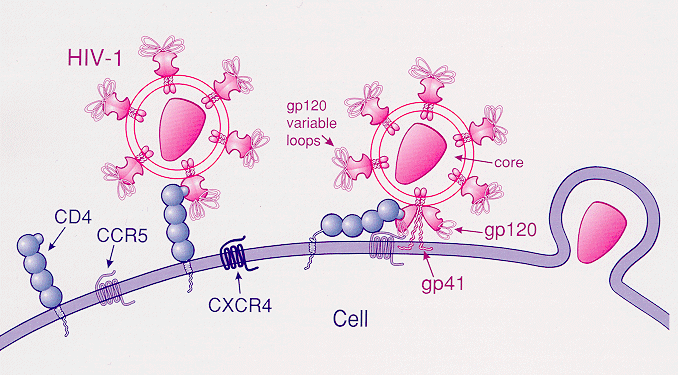
This image shows the different receptors and subunits involved in the mechanism of anchorage and fusion of HIV-1 with its target cell

VIR-576 belongs to a kind of drugs categorized as antiretroviral, specifically it is an anchoring inhibitor that blocks HIV-1 entry into the host cell. It binds to a concrete hydrophobic fusion peptide called gp41, which is a transmembrane glycoprotein located in the retrovirus HIV-1 envelope. Target cell interacts with the gp41 peptide in order to form a pre-hairpin structure which joins HIV-1 and host cell membranes.

Gp41 is exposed with the assistance of another glycoprotein (gp120) also located in the envelope of the retrovirus. The structural reason is based on the fact that two gp41 combine with other gp120 composing a trimer. Firstly, it interacts with the receptor CD4 of a T4 human cell (also called Th or helper lymphocyte). The fusion causes an increase of concentration of HIV-1 on the target cell's surface, and that promotes a switch which increases the affinity of gp120 for chemokine receptors that are disposed onto the target cell surface. This interaction produces a conformational change in the glycoprotein gp120 that exposes gp41. This process would be active because VIR-576 does not interferes in this part of it, but when gp41 is exposed, the developed drug VIR-576 would commence its mechanism of action and the inhibition of the fusion would start to take place.

VIR-576 binding to gp41 inhibits the anchoring of the virus and the membrane fusion, and that means that the genetic controlling material of the retrovirus HIV-1 can not be introduced in the T4 lymphocyte. As a result, infection would not be initiated.

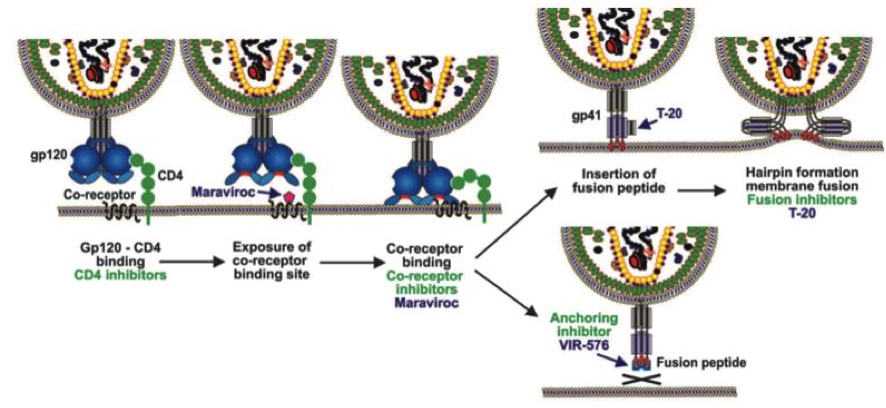
Mechanism of action of Maraviroc and T-20. Comparison with VIR-576

=== Differences from other antiretroviral drugs ===
VIR-576 mechanism of action differs from other drugs. Enfuvirtide (also known as T-20), for example, is a fusion inhibitor which binds to a region of the glycoprotein gp41 called HR1 in order to prevent membrane fusion. While enfurtivide inhibits the formation of the hairpin which is able to trigger the membrane fusion, VIR-576 directly blocks the insertion inhibiting the anchorage which is the previous stage of the hairpin formation (because to develop the hairpin it is necessary the fusion and VIR-576 impedes it.

== Dosage forms ==
VIR-576 is actually under clinical trials (together with Sifurtivide). In 2010, in order to examine the efficacy of the peptide, a short-term monotherapy in HIV-infected patients was executed by a group of researchers. The results were proof of concept that fusion peptide inhibitors suppress viral replication in human patients, and offer prospects for the development of a new class of drugs that prevent virus particles from anchoring to and infecting host cells. The dosage form described below, belongs to the mentioned study.

Once the VIR-576 was chemically synthesized, it followed a purifying method that turned it into a highly pure drug substance, which was dehydrated in 500ml vials. Immediately before its use, the antiretroviral drug was dissolved in a second vial with bicarbonate-buddered saline, so it could be used in infusions.

The doses of VIR-576 were different between the groups of the study, but the highest one (5,0 grams per day) was the one which reduced more the viral load in the plasma.

== Advantages ==
Compared with other antiretroviral drugs such as Enfuvirtide and Maraviroc, VIR-576's mechanism has allowed it to being effective against resistant strains. The reason why is so efficient is that gp41 protein can not mute, so, as a result VIR-576 will always be active as a HIV-1 fusion inhibitor.

Even since its discovery, VIRIP was more efficient to prevent HIV's infection of T4 lymphocyte, independently of the presence of CCR5 receptors or CXCR4, and it was also effective against a large subtypes of HIV-1.

The patients under treatment were carefully monitored, and most of them didn't show secondary effects. Generally, the effects were temporal and tolerable like constipation, headaches, and fever, but a couple of patients showed allergic reactions and hyperbilirubinemia. The side effects were less severe in the high- dose treatment group and thus were not related to the dosage of VIR- 576. In conclusion, VIR-576 was well tolerated and did not cause major adverse effects.

== See also ==
- Retrovirus
- HIV
- Antiretroviral drug
- Fusion inhibitor
- T helper cell
- CD4
- Gp120
- Gp41
