= Leronlimab =

Monoclonal antibody

Monoclonal antibody
- Type: Whole antibody
- Source: Humanized
- Target: CCR5

Clinical data
- Other names: PRO 140
- ATC code: none

Identifiers
- CAS Number: 674782-26-4
- DrugBank: DB05941
- ChemSpider: none
- UNII: Y1J4NP8FF0
- KEGG: D11399
- ChEMBL: ChEMBL2109343
- NIAID ChemDB: 088103

Leronlimab (codenamed PRO 140) is a humanized monoclonal antibody targeted against the CCR5 receptor found on T lymphocytes of the human immune system. It is being investigated as a potential therapy in the treatment of triple negative breast cancer and HIV infection.

The United States Food and Drug Administration has designated PRO 140 for fast-track approval.

It was investigated as a treatment for COVID-19 but found to be ineffective for that purpose.

== Development ==
PRO 140 is being developed by Cytodyn Inc. In May 2007, results from the phase I clinical trial of the drug demonstrated "potent, rapid, prolonged, dose-dependent, highly significant antiviral activity" for PRO 140. Participants in the highest-dosing group received 5 milligrams per kilogram and showed an average viral load decrease of -1.83 log_{10}. On average, reductions of greater than -1 log_{10} per milliliter were maintained for between two and three weeks, from only a single dose of the drug. The largest individual HIV RNA reductions ranged up to -2.5 log_{10} among patients receiving both the 2 and 5 mg/kg doses.

In February 2018, Cytodyn Inc reported that the primary endpoint was achieved in the PRO 140 pivotal combination therapy trial in HIV infection and will continue for an additional 24 weeks (end of August 2018) with PRO 140 weekly subcutaneous injections and optimized ART. The report discloses that a single 350mg subcutaneous injection of PRO 140 resulted in a HIV-1 RNA viral load reduction greater than 0.5log or 68% within one week compared with those who received a placebo. The primary efficacy endpoint results were presented at ASM Microbe 2018. In the pivotal trial of Leronlimab in combination with standard anti-retroviral therapies in HIV-infected treatment-experienced patients, 81% of patients completing trial achieved HIV viral load suppression of < 50 cp/mL. Recent approved drugs for this population range from 43% after 24 weeks to 45% after 48 weeks with viral load suppression of < 50 cp/mL. In March 2019 CytoDyn filed with the US FDA the first part of the BLA for leronlimab (PRO140) as a combination therapy with HAART in HIV. In December 2019, the company affirmed plans to complete the BLA in January 2020 with potential FDA approval in 2Q'20. CytoDyn is also conducting an investigative monotherapy trial of leronlimab (PRO140) for HIV. If successful, once per week self-administered leronlimab would represent a paradigm shift in treatment of HIV.

CytoDyn is also currently investigating the use of Leronlimab (PRO140) in various solid tumors. On February 18, 2019, CytoDyn announced it will begin 8 pre-clinical studies on melanoma, pancreatic, breast, prostate, colon, lung, liver, and stomach cancer. On November 23, 2018, CytoDyn received FDA approval of its IND submission and allowed to initiate a Phase 1b/2 clinical trial for metastatic triple-negative breast cancer (mTNBC) patients. In May 2019, the U.S. Food and Drug Administration (FDA) granted Fast Track Designation for Leronlimab (PRO 140) for use in combination with carboplatin for the treatment of patients with CCR5-positive mTNBC. In July 2019, CytoDyn announced the dosing of first mTNBC patient under compassionate use. Simultaneously, the phase 1b/2 trial for treatment-naïve mTNBC patients is active and anticipates top line data in 2020. If successful, the data from treatment-naïve mTNBC patients could serve as the basis for potentially seeking accelerated US FDA approval. On November 11, 2019, CytoDyn reported that the first TNBC patient injected under its naïve protocol (not previously treated for triple-negative breast cancer) demonstrated significantly reduced levels of circulating tumor cells (CTCs) and decreased tumor size at two-week and five-week observation intervals compared to baseline observations. CTCs are a potential surrogate endpoint in oncology trials, with reduced levels suggesting long-term clinical benefit. Recent published studies demonstrated Leronlimab reduced the number and size of new human breast cancer metastasis in a mouse model and reduced the size of established metastasis thereby extending survival.

In May 2019, CytoDyn also initiated a pre-clinical study of Leronlimab (PRO 140) to prevent nonalcoholic steatohepatitis with The Cleveland Clinic. In November, the company reported positive results.

On December 15, 2020, CytoDyn reached full enrollment in its Phase 3 registrational trial for patients with severe-to-critical COVID-19. The drug failed to demonstrate a statistically significant improvement in mortality compared to the control arm of the study. Moreover, the US Food & Drug Administration took the unusual measure of releasing a statement regarding the lack of demonstrated efficacy of leronlimab in CytoDyn's COVID-19 clinical trials.

== Mechanism of action ==
PRO 140 is a lab-made antibody that functions as an entry inhibitor. PRO 140 binds to the CCR5 receptor on the CD4 cells, and interferes with HIV's ability to enter the cell. PRO 140, a humanized form of a PA14 antibody, is a chemokine-receptor CCR5 monoclonal antibody and can inhibit CCR5 tropic HIV-1 at concentrations that do not antagonize the natural activity of CCR5 in vitro. HIV-1 entry is mediated by the HIV-1 envelope glycoproteins gp120 and gp41. The gp120 will bind CD4 and the CCR5co receptor molecule, and this triggers gp41-mediated fusion of the viral and cellular membranes. CCR5 is needed for the entry of the virus and the infection of healthy cells. PRO 140, the anti-CCR5 monoclonal antibody, can stop HIV from entering the cell and stop viral replication. It prevents the virus-cell binding at a distinct site in the CCR5 co-receptor without interfering with its natural activity. Unlike other entry inhibitors, PRO 140 is a monoclonal antibody. The mechanism of inhibition is competitive rather than allosteric. As such, it must be injected to be effective. However, once inside the body, PRO 140 binds to CCR5 for >60 days, which may allow for dosing as infrequently as every other week. Compared to highly-active antiretroviral therapy, which has been shown to have treatment-related toxicities for HIV-infected patients, PRO140 has no multi-drug resistance or toxicities.

== Research ==
=== COVID-19 ===
Leronlimab, a monoclonal antibody investigational drug under development by CytoDyn, Inc. (CytoDyn), is one of the potential medicines that has been studied to determine whether it is safe and effective in treating patients with COVID-19, including those with severe outcomes from COVID-19. With the conclusion of both the CD10 and CD12 clinical trials, it has become clear that the data currently available do not support the clinical benefit of leronlimab for the treatment of COVID-19.

== See also ==
- Discovery and development of CCR5 receptor antagonists
- Antiretroviral
