= C21H27N5 =

The molecular formula C_{21}H_{27}N_{5} may refer to:

- D75-4590
- Mavorixafor
