= CXCR4 antagonist =

A CXCR4 antagonist is a substance which blocks the CXCR4 receptor and prevent its activation. Blocking the receptor stops the receptor's ligand, CXCL12, from binding which prevents downstream effects. CXCR4 antagonists are especially important for hindering cancer progression because one of the downstream effects initiated by CXCR4 receptor activation is cell movement which helps the spread of cancer, known as metastasis. The CXCR4 receptor has been targeted by antagonistic substances since being identified as a co-receptor in HIV and assisting the development of cancer. Macrocyclic ligands have been utilised as CXCR4 antagonists.

Plerixafor is an example of a CXCR4 antagonist, and has approvals (e.g. US FDA 2008) for clinical use (to mobilize hematopoietic stem cells).

BL-8040 is a CXCR4 antagonist that has undergone clinical trials (e.g. in various leukemias), with one planned for pancreatic cancer (in combination with pembrolizumab). Previously called BKT140, it is a synthetic cyclic 14-residue peptide with an aromatic ring. In a 2018 mouse tumor model study, BL-8040 treatment enhanced anti-tumor immune response potentially by increasing the CD8+ T-cells in the tumor microenvironment.

Mavorixafor (Xolremdi) is a small-molecule drug that targets CXCR4 mutations, it was approved for medical use in the United States in April of 2024 for the treatment of WHIM syndrome.
