= USP14 =

Protein-coding gene in the species Homo sapiens

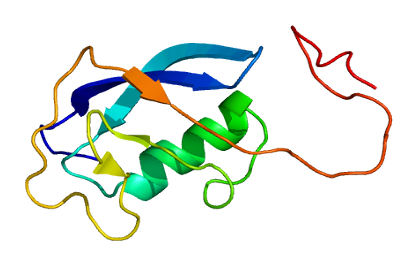

Identifiers
- Aliases: USP14, TGT, ubiquitin specific peptidase 14, Ubp6
- External IDs: OMIM: 607274; MGI: 1928898; GeneCards: USP14
Available structures
PDB	Ortholog search: PDBe RCSB
PDB	List of PDB id codes 2AYN, 2AYO
Enzyme activity
EC #	BRENDA	ExPASy	KEGG	MetaCyc
3.4.19.12	↗	↗	↗	↗

Gene location (Human)
Chr.	Chromosome 18 (human)
Band	18p11.32	Start	158,383 bp
Band	18p11.32	End	214,629 bp

Gene location (Mouse)
Chr.	Chromosome 18 (mouse)
Band	18 A1|18 4.91 cM	Start	9,993,066 bp
Band	18 A1|18 4.91 cM	End	10,045,119 bp
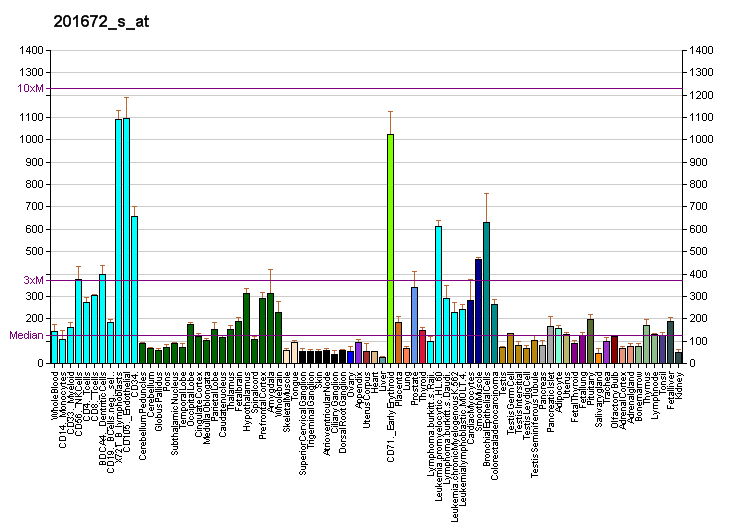

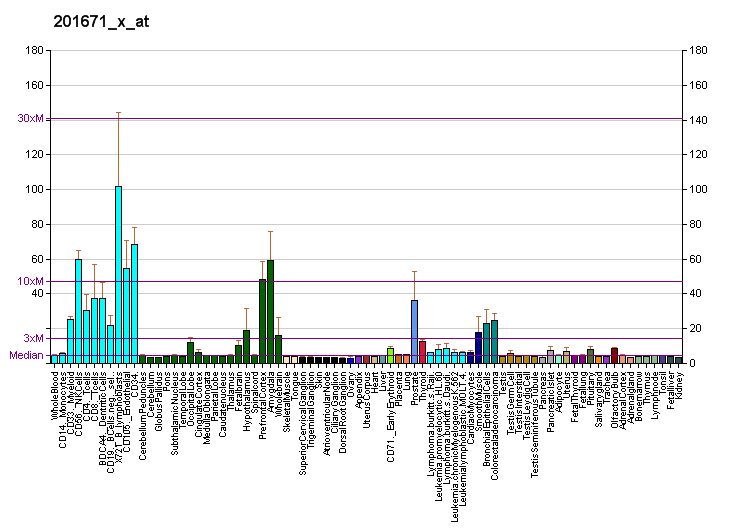
RNA expression pattern
Bgee	Human / Mouse (ortholog); Top expressed in: secondary oocyte; tibialis anterior muscle; deltoid muscle; pons; thoracic diaphragm; trabecular bone; trigeminal ganglion; lateral nuclear group of thalamus; skin of hip; spinal ganglia / Top expressed in: tail of embryo; dorsomedial hypothalamic nucleus; ventromedial nucleus; dentate gyrus of hippocampal formation granule cell; epiblast; lateral septal nucleus; mammillary body; lateral hypothalamus; superior frontal gyrus; maxillary prominence; More reference expression data
BioGPS	More reference expression data
Gene ontology
Molecular function	cysteine-type peptidase activity; proteasome binding; peptidase activity; protein binding; thiol-dependent deubiquitinase; cysteine-type endopeptidase activity; endopeptidase inhibitor activity; hydrolase activity; tRNA guanylyltransferase activity
Cellular component	membrane; plasma membrane; synapse; cell surface; proteasome complex; extracellular exosome; cytoplasm; cytosol; cytoplasmic vesicle; nucleus
Biological process	regulation of proteasomal protein catabolic process; regulation of chemotaxis; ubiquitin-dependent protein catabolic process; proteolysis; negative regulation of ER-associated ubiquitin-dependent protein catabolic process; chemical synaptic transmission; negative regulation of endopeptidase activity; protein deubiquitination; immune system process; innate immune response; tRNA 5'-end processing
Sources:Amigo / QuickGO
Orthologs
Databases	NCBI: entry; OMA: entry
Species	Human	Mouse
Entrez	9097	59025
Ensembl	ENSG00000101557	ENSMUSG00000047879
UniProt	P54578	Q9JMA1
RefSeq (mRNA)	NM_005151; NM_001037334	NM_001038589; NM_021522; NM_001360884
RefSeq (protein)	NP_001032411; NP_005142	NP_001033678; NP_067497; NP_001347813
Location (UCSC)	Chr 18: 0.16 – 0.21 Mb	Chr 18: 9.99 – 10.05 Mb
PubMed search
- Wikidata
View/Edit Human	View/Edit Mouse

Ubiquitin-specific protease 14 is an enzyme that in humans is encoded by the USP14 gene.

This gene encodes a member of the ubiquitin-specific processing (UBP) family of proteases that is a deubiquitinating enzyme (DUB) with His and Cys domains. This protein is located in the cytoplasm and cleaves the ubiquitin moiety from ubiquitin-fused precursors and ubiquitinylated proteins. Mice with a mutation that results in reduced expression of the ortholog of this protein are retarded for growth, develop severe tremors by 2 to 3 weeks of age followed by hindlimb paralysis and death by 6 to 10 weeks of age. Alternate transcriptional splice variants, encoding different isoforms, have been characterized.

== Interactions ==
USP14 has been shown to interact with CXCR4.

== Inhibitors ==
- IU1 and related compounds
- VLX1570 (non selective inhibitor of proteasome deubiquitinases)
- Degrasyn (WP1130) (non selective deubiquitinase inhibitor acting at USP9, USP5, USP14, and UCH37)
