= WHIM syndrome =

- WHIM syndrome has an autosomal dominant pattern of inheritance.
- Specialty: Immunology
- Symptoms: low red blood cells a higher risk of infections

WHIM syndrome (or Warts, Hypogammaglobulinemia, Immunodeficiency, and Myelokathexis syndrome) is a rare congenital immunodeficiency disorder characterized by chronic noncyclic neutropenia.

== Pathophysiology ==
WHIM syndrome results from autosomal dominant mutations in the gene for the chemokine receptor, CXCR4, resulting in a carboxy-terminus truncation of the receptor of between 10 and 19 residues. The gene mutant is located on 2q21. The truncation of the receptor protein results in the inability of downregulation after stimulation. Thus, the receptor remain in an activated state. WHIM syndrome is one of only a few diseases directly and primarily caused by an aberrant chemokine, making its molecular biology important in understanding the role of cell signaling and trafficking.

An association with GRK3 has also been observed.

== Diagnosis ==
Patients exhibit increased susceptibility to bacterial and viral infections, especially from common serotype human papilloma virus, resulting in warts on the hands and feet starting in childhood. Myelokathexis refers to retention (kathexis) of neutrophils in the bone marrow (myelo). In addition, lymphocytes and IgG antibody levels (gammaglobulins) are often deficient.

== Treatment ==
Infusions of immune globulin can reduce the frequency of bacterial infections, and G-CSF or GM-CSF therapy improves blood neutrophil counts.

As WHIM syndrome is a molecular disease arising from gain-of-function mutations in CXCR4, preclinical studies identified plerixafor, a specific CXCR4 antagonist, as a potential mechanism-based therapeutic for the disease. Two subsequent clinical trials involving a handful of patients with WHIM syndrome demonstrated that plerixafor could increase white blood cell counts and continues to be a promising targeted therapy.

A woman with spontaneous remission of her WHIM syndrome due to chromothripsis in one of her blood stem cells has been identified.

In support of these studies, a 2014 phase I clinical trial treated three patients diagnosed with WHIM syndrome with plerixafor twice a day for six months. All three patients presented with multiple reoccurring infections before treatment and all had an increase in their white blood cell count post treatment. One patient (P3) had a decrease in his infections by 40% while the remaining two patients (P1 and P2) had no infections throughout the entirety of the treatment. Plerixafor may also prove to have anti-human papillomavirus (HPV) properties as all patients experienced a shrinkage or complete disappearance of their warts. While this treatment shows promise in treating neutropenia (decreased white blood cells), this trial showed no increase of immune globulins in the body. A phase III clinical trial has been approved to compare the infection prevention ability of plerixafor versus the current treatment of G-CSF in patients with WHIM.

Mavorixafor (Xolremdi) is a small-molecule drug that targets CXCR4 mutations, it was approved for medical use in the United States in April of 2024.
