= Entry inhibitor =

Antiviral drug

Entry inhibitors, also known as fusion inhibitors, are a class of antiviral drugs that prevent a virus from entering a cell, for example, by blocking a receptor. Entry inhibitors are used to treat conditions such as HIV, hepatitis D, and hepatitis B.

== HIV entry ==
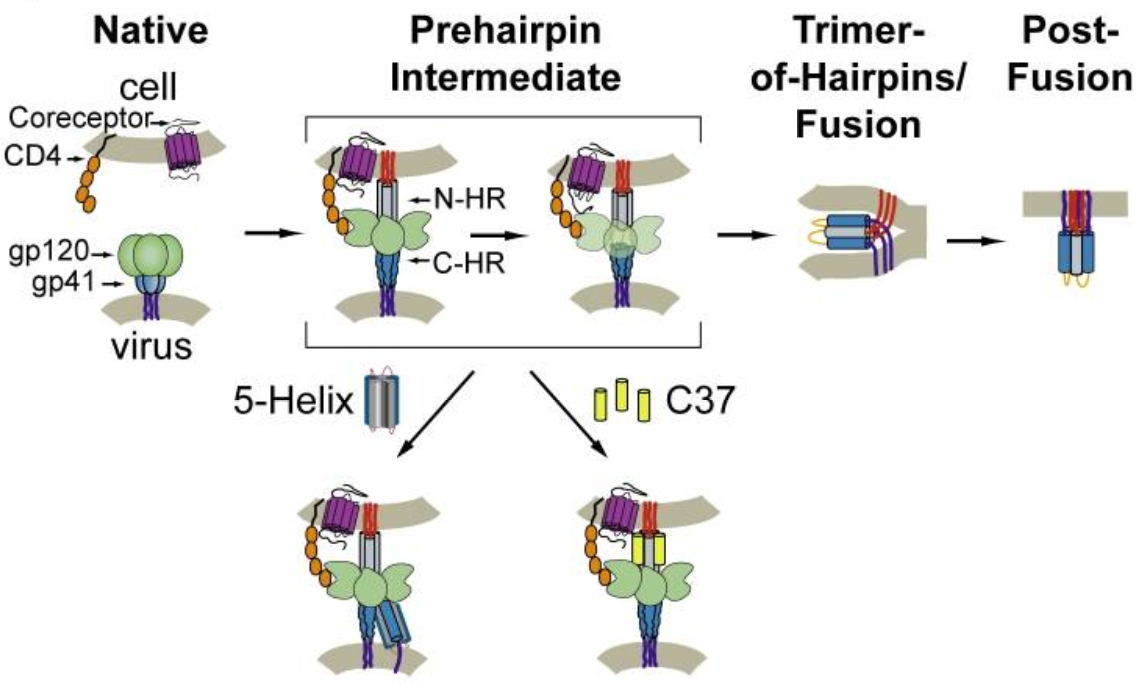
An illustration of HIV entry mechanism and mechanisms of action (MOA) of two entry inhibitor, 5-Helix and C37.

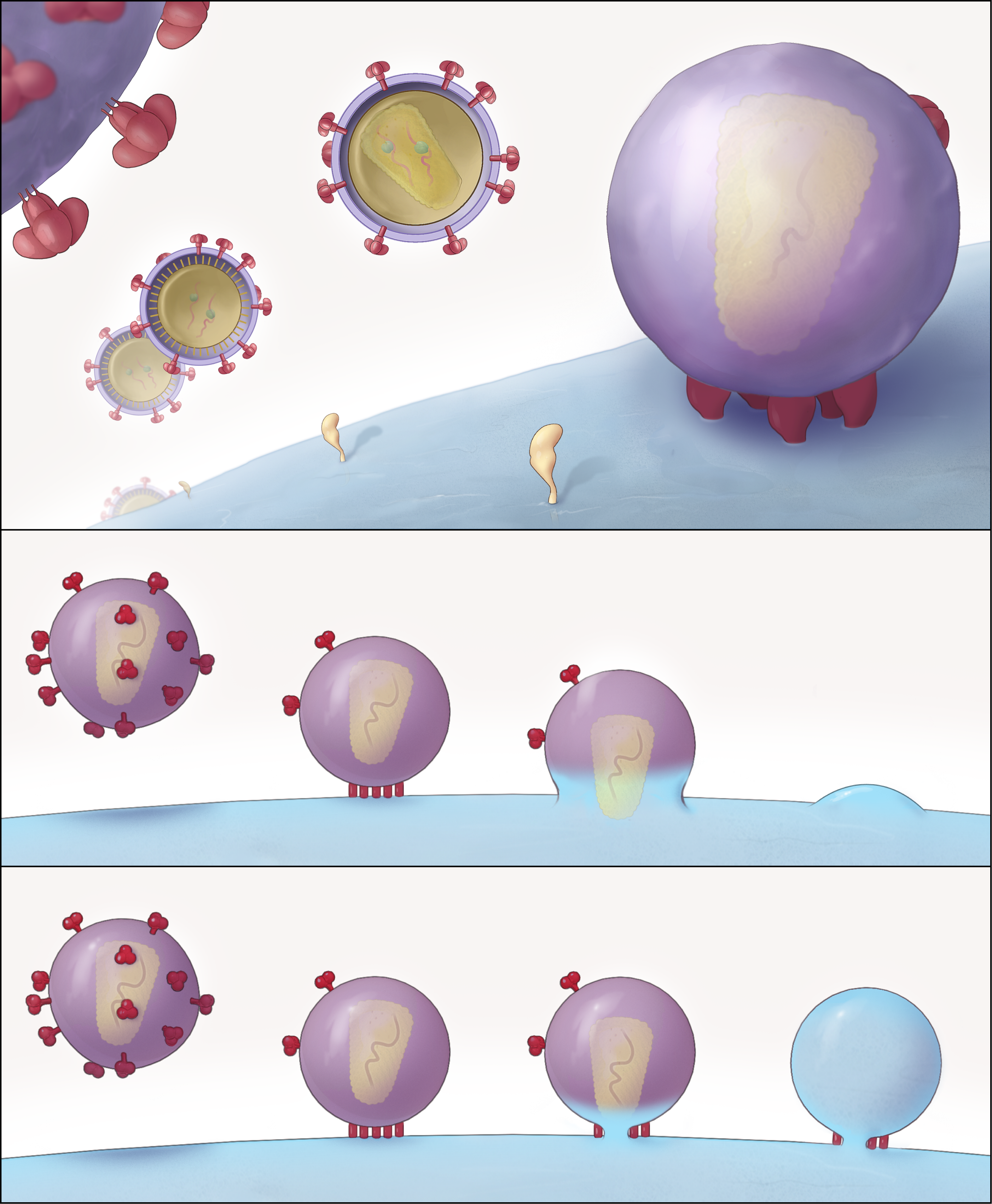
An HIV virion binds to a CD4+ human cell. The two bottom pictures depict two proposed models of HIV fusion with the cell.

They are used in combination therapy for the treatment of HIV infection. This class of drugs interferes with the binding, fusion and entry of an HIV virion to a human cell. By blocking this step in HIV's replication cycle, such agents slow the progression from HIV infection to AIDS.

=== Proteins ===
There are several key proteins involved in the HIV entry process.

- CD4, a protein receptor found on the surface of helper T cells in the human immune system, also called CD4+ T cells
- gp120, a protein on HIV surface that binds to the CD4 receptor
- CCR5, a second receptor found on the surface of CD4+ cells and macrophages, called a chemokine co-receptor
- CXCR4, another chemokine co-receptor found on CD4+ cells
- gp41, an HIV protein, closely associated with gp120, that penetrates the cell membrane

=== Binding, fusion, entry sequence ===
HIV entry into a human cell requires the following steps in sequence.

1. The binding of HIV surface protein gp120 to the CD4 receptor
2. A conformational change in gp120, which both increases its affinity for a co-receptor and exposes gp41
3. The binding of gp120 to a co-receptor either CCR5 or CXCR4
4. The penetration of the cell membrane by gp41, which approximates the membrane of HIV and the T cell and promotes their fusion
5. The entry of the viral core into the cell

Entry inhibitors work by interfering with one aspect of this process.

== Approved agents ==
- Maraviroc binds to CCR5, preventing an interaction with gp120. It is also referred to as a "chemokine receptor antagonist" or a "CCR5 inhibitor."
- Enfuvirtide binds to gp41 and interferes with its ability to approximate the two membranes. It is also referred to as a "fusion inhibitor."
- Ibalizumab, a monoclonal antibody that binds to domain 2 of CD4 and interferes with post-attachment steps required for the entry of HIV-1 virus particles into host cells and prevents the viral transmission that occurs via cell-cell fusion.
- Fostemsavir, an attachment inhibitor that interferes with the interaction of CD4 and gp120 by binding with gp120.
- Bulevirtide (Hepcludex), is an entry inhibitor that blocks the NTCP receptor on liver cells, preventing Hepatitis B and D viruses from entering. It was granted full marketing authorization by the European Commission in 2023.

== Investigational agents ==
Other agents are under investigation for their ability to interact with the proteins involved in HIV entry and the possibility that they may serve as entry inhibitors.

- Leronlimab, a monoclonal antibody that binds CCR5
- Plerixafor was being developed to interfere with interaction between HIV and CXCR4, but showed little useful antiviral activity in recent trials.
- Epigallocatechin gallate, a substance found in green tea, appears to interact with gp120 as do several other theaflavins.
- Vicriviroc, similar to maraviroc, is currently undergoing clinical trials for FDA approval.
- Aplaviroc, an agent similar to maraviroc and vicriroc. Clinical trials were halted in 2005 over concerns about the drug's safety.
- b12 is an antibody against HIV found in some long-term nonprogressors. It has been found to bind to gp120 at the exact region, or epitope, where gp120 binds to CD4. b12 seems to serve as a natural entry inhibitor in some individuals. It is hoped that further study of b12 may lead to an effective HIV vaccine.
- Griffithsin, a substance derived from algae, appears to have entry inhibitor properties.
- DCM205, is a small molecule based on L-chicoric acid, an integrase inhibitor. DCM205 has been reported to inactivate HIV-1 particles directly in vitro and is thought to act primarily as an entry inhibitor.
- CD4 specific Designed Ankyrin Repeat Proteins (DARPins) potently block viral entry of diverse strains and are being developed and studied as potential microbicide candidates
- A polyclonal caprine antibody is in phase II human clinical trials that targets, among others sites, the GP41 transmembrane glycoprotein. The trials are being conducted by Virionyx, a New Zealand Company.
- VIR-576 is a synthesized peptide which binds to gp41, preventing fusion of the virus with a cell membrane.
- ITX5061 for hepatitis C.
