= BSCI =

BSCI may refer to:

- Business Social Compliance Initiative, a supply chain monitoring certification (BSCI)
- Cisco Career Certifications, Building Scalable Cisco Internetworks (BSCI)
- Broad-Spectrum Chemokine Inhibitor (BSCI), a class of anti-inflammatory drug
- Boston Scientific, a Fortune 500 medical device company
