= NR58-3.14.3 =

NR58.3-14-3
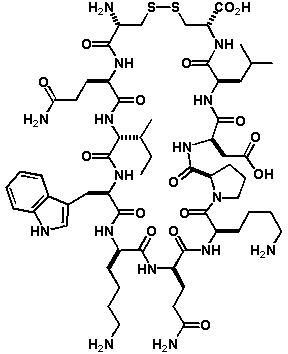

Names
- IUPAC name (3S,6S,9S,12S,15R,18R,21R,26S,29R)-21-amino-3,9-bis(4-aminobutyl)-6,18-bis(3-amino-3-oxopropyl)-15-[(2S)-butan-2-yl]-32-(carboxymethyl)-12-(1H-indol-3-ylmethyl)-29-(2-methylpropyl)-2,5,8,11,14,17,20,28,31,34-decaoxo-23,24-dithia-1,4,7,10,13,16,19,27,30,33-decazabicyclo[33.3.0]octatriacontane-26-carboxylic acid

Identifiers
3D model (JSmol)	Interactive image
PubChem CID	101115478
- InChI: InChI=1S/C60H94N16O16S2/c1-5-32(4)49-58(89)73-42(26-33-28-66-36-14-7-6-13-34(33)36)55(86)68-37(15-8-10-22-61)51(82)69-38(18-20-46(64)77)52(83)70-40(16-9-11-23-62)59(90)76-24-12-17-45(76)57(88)72-43(27-48(79)80)56(87)71-41(25-31(2)3)54(85)74-44(60(91)92)30-94-93-29-35(63)50(81)67-39(53(84)75-49)19-21-47(65)78/h6-7,13-14,28,31-32,35,37-45,49,66H,5,8-12,15-27,29-30,61-63H2,1-4H3,(H2,64,77)(H2,65,78)(H,67,81)(H,68,86)(H,69,82)(H,70,83)(H,71,87)(H,72,88)(H,73,89)(H,74,85)(H,75,84)(H,79,80)(H,91,92)/t32-,35-,37-,38-,39+,40-,41+,42-,43?,44+,45?,49+/m0/s1 Key: FBAWIVCCEBIKFB-QOQTVHDZSA-N
- SMILES: CC[C@H](C)[C@@H]1C(=O)N[C@H](C(=O)N[C@H](C(=O)N[C@H](C(=O)N[C@H](C(=O)N2CCCC2C(=O)NC(C(=O)N[C@@H](C(=O)N[C@H](CSSC[C@@H](C(=O)N[C@@H](C(=O)N1)CCC(=O)N)N)C(=O)O)CC(C)C)CC(=O)O)CCCCN)CCC(=O)N)CCCCN)CC3=CNC4=CC=CC=C43

Properties
Chemical formula	C_{60}H_{94}N_{16}O_{16}S_{2}
Molar mass	1359.63 g·mol^{−1}
- Except where otherwise noted, data are given for materials in their standard state (at 25 °C [77 °F], 100 kPa). verify (what is ?) Infobox references

NR58.3-14-3 is a cyclic peptide consisting of 11 D-amino acids. It is a broad-spectrum chemokine inhibitor and anti-inflammatory agent.

== Development from 'Peptide 3' ==
'Peptide 3' is a 12-amino acid linear peptide corresponding to amino acids 51 to 62 of mature human chemokine CCL2. It is formed from L-amino acids with the sequence NH_{2}-Glu-Ile-Cys-Ala-Asp-Pro-Lys-Gln-Lys-Trp-Val-Gln-OH (or in single letter code NH_{2}-EICADPKQKWVQ-OH). 'Peptide 3' was found to be a Broad-Spectrum Chemokine Inhibitor inhibiting chemotaxis of human myelomonocytic cell line THP-1 monocytes and human neutrophils induced by a range of chemokines including CCL2, CCL3, CXCL8 and CXCL12 with roughly equal potency of 10μM, but not migration induced by other non-chemokine chemoattractants such as n-formyl-Met-Leu-Phe (fMLP) or TGF-β. Biotinylated 'Peptide 3' was found to bind to THP-1 cells with a disassociation constant of roughly 10μM. This suggested that 'Peptide 3' functions as a chemokine receptor antagonist. This mechanism was later proved to not be in action.

=== Structure-activity experiments ===
When the 12-amino acid sequence of 'peptide 3'/CCL2 is aligned with the sequences of the other chemokines CCL3, CXCL8 and CXCL12 5 amino acids are conserved, Cys3, Asp5, Pro6, Trp10 and Gln12. In addition Val11 is also present in CCL3 and CXCL8. The corresponding 11th amino acid in CXCL12 is Ile. Ala4 in CCL2 is also present in CCL3 but the corresponding residue is Leu in CXCL8 and Ile in CXCL12. Inclusion of Leu at position 4 and Ile at position 11 (NH_{2}-EICLDPKQKWIQ-OH) increased the inhibition potency of the peptide to 2-4μM.

Removal of the first two residues from 'Peptide 3' (NH_{2}-CADPKQKWVQ-OH) does not lower its BSCI potency.

Peptide 3-Leu4, Ile11, the most potent BSCI peptide was chosen for further development. The first two amino acids were removed, and then according to the method of Jameson et al., the amino acid sequence was reversed and the amino acids replaced with D-amino acids. This combined transformation changes the orientation of the amides in the backbone but does not change the position of the amino acid sidechains. The peptide was then cyclised by adding a cysteine to the other end (HO-CLDPKQKWIQC-NH_{2}), and oxidisation to form a disulfide bond to give NR58,3-14-3.

== In vitro activity ==
Like 'Peptide 3', NR58,3-14-3 is a broad-spectrum chemokine inhibitor. It however significantly more active than its earlier analogues migration inhibition potencies of 2.5 to 25 nM vs. CCL2, CCL3, CCL5 and CXCL12 with THP-1 monocytes, and vs. CXCL8 with neutrophils. In addition NR58,3-14-3 does not significantly inhibit leukocyte migration due to the other non-chemokine chemoattractants fMLP and C5a.

== In vivo activity ==
NR58-3.14.3 also inhibits the recruitment of leukocytes (macrophages, T cells, B cells) due to the chemokine CCL2 in rat skin. A similar effect was observed using Lipopolysaccharide (LPS) instead of CCL2 (macrophages, neutrophils, T cells, B cells). In addition NR58-3.14.3 inhibits LPS-induced accumulation of tumour necrosis factor-α (TNF-α). This is consistent with the peptide acting as a chemokine inhibitor up-steam of TNF-α productsion and anti-inflammatory in vivo.

The cyclic peptide NR58-3.14.3 was shown to be a powerful anti-inflammatory agent in vivo inhibiting inflammation in a number of disease models such as atherosclerosis, ischemia, lung disease, surgical adhesions, endometriosis and pulmonary graft-versus-host disease. It has been suggested that blockage of chemokine function using these molecules should not have a detrimental toxicological effect.

=== Anti-HIV activity ===
Cyclic peptide NR58-3.14.3 has also been shown to inhibit HIV replication.

=== Related compounds ===
Other peptide sequences derived from MCP-1 have been shown to elicit and inhibit cell migration.
