= Gp41 =

Subunit of the envelope protein complex of retroviruses

GP41
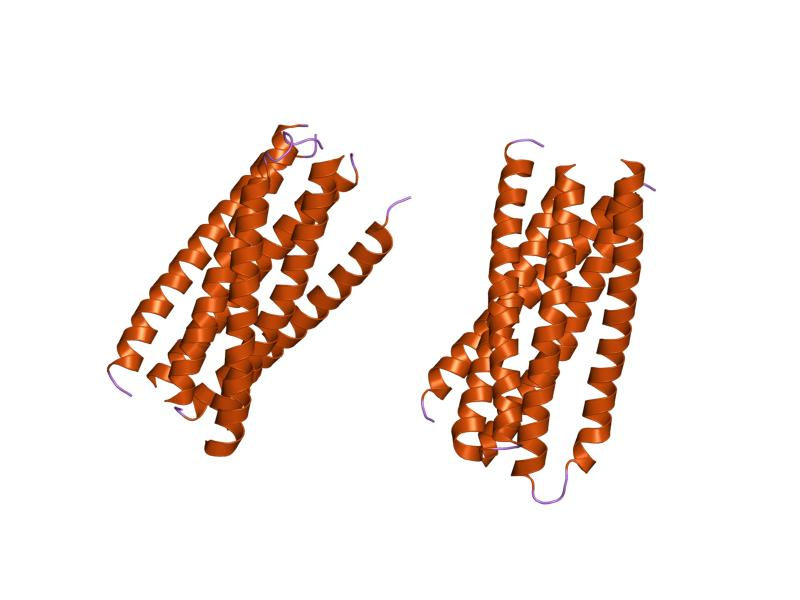
- Example crystal structures of HIV-1 envelope glycoprotein Gp41

Identifiers
- Symbol: GP41
- Pfam: PF00517
- InterPro: IPR000328
- SCOP2: 2siv / SCOPe / SUPFAM
Available protein structures:
- PDB: IPR000328 PF00517 (ECOD; PDBsum)
- AlphaFold: IPR000328; PF00517

Gp41 also known as glycoprotein 41 is a subunit of the envelope protein complex of retroviruses, including human immunodeficiency virus (HIV). Gp41 is a transmembrane protein that contains several sites within its ectodomain that are required for infection of host cells. As a result of its importance in host cell infection, it has also received much attention as a potential target for HIV vaccines.

== Gene and post-translational modifications ==
Gp41 is coded with gp120 as one gp160 by the env gene of HIV. Gp160 is then extensively glycosylated and proteolytically cleaved by furin, a host cellular protease. The high glycosylation of the env-coded glycoproteins allows them to escape the human body's immune system. In contrast to gp120, however, gp41 is less glycosylated and more conserved (less prone to genetic variations). Once gp160 has been cleaved into its individual subunits, the subunits are then associated non-covalently on the surface of the viral envelope.

== Structure ==
Gp41 and gp120, when non-covalently bound to each other, are referred to as the envelope spike complex and are formed as a heterotrimer of three gp41 and three gp120. These complexes found on the surface of HIV are responsible for the attachment, fusion, and ultimately the infection of host cells. The structure is cage-like with a hollow center that inhibits antibody access. While gp120 sits on the surface of the viral envelope, gp41 is the transmembrane portion of the spike protein complex with a portion of the glycoprotein buried within the viral envelope at all times.

Gp41 has three prominent regions within the sequence: the ectodomain, the transmembrane domain, and the cytoplasmic domain. The ectodomain, which comprises residues 511-684, can be further broken down into the fusion peptide region (residues 512-527), the helical N-terminal heptad repeat (NHR) and C-terminal heptad repeat (CHR). In addition to these regions, there is also a loop region that contains disulfide bonds that stabilize the hairpin structure (the folded conformation of gp41) and a region called the membrane proximal external region (MPER) which contains kinks that are antigen target regions. The fusion peptide region is normally buried or hidden by the non-covalent interactions between gp120 and gp41, at a point which looks torus-like. This prevents the fusion peptide from interacting with other regions that are not its intended target region.

== Function ==
In a free virion, the fusion peptides at the amino termini of gp41 are buried within the envelope complex in an inactive non-fusogengic state that is stabilized by a non-covalent bond with gp120. Gp120 binds to a CD4 and a co-receptor (CCR5 or CXCR4), found on susceptible cells such as Helper T cells and macrophages. As a result, a cascade of conformational changes occurs in the gp120 and gp41 proteins. These conformational changes start with gp120 that rearranges to expose the binding sites for the coreceptors mentioned above. The core of gp41 then folds into a six helical bundle (a coiled coil) structure exposing the previously hidden hydrophobic gp41 fusion peptides that are inserted in the host cell membrane allowing fusion to take place. This fusion process is facilitated by the hairpin conformational structure. The inner core of this conformation is 3 NHRs which have hydrophobic pockets that allow it to bind anti-parallel to specific residues on the CHR. The activation process occurs readily, which suggests that the inactive state of gp41 is metastable and the conformational changes allow gp41 to achieve its more stable active state. Furthermore, these conformational changes are irreversible processes.

HIV-1 fusion process. It involves both subunits of the envelope spike complex. Notably, gp41 is shown in green with its transmembrane region buried in the virion membrane, both segments of heptad repeats (CHR closer to the virus and NHR closer to the host cell) before and after conformational changes, and the N-terminal end of the ectodomain in gray. In the last two panels pointed out by the red arrows, gp41 is observed following penetration of the host cell and following a conformational change resulting in the six-helix bundle which brings the viral and cell membranes into close proximity.

== As a drug target ==
The interaction of gp41 fusion peptides with the target cell causes a formation of an intermediate, pre-hairpin structure which bridges and fuses the viral and host membranes together. The pre-hairpin structure has a relatively long half-life which makes it a potential target for therapeutic intervention and inhibitory peptides.

Enfuvirtide (also known as T-20) is a 36-residue alpha-peptide fusion inhibitor drug that binds to the pre-hairpin structure and prevents membrane fusion and HIV-1 entry to the cell. The vulnerability of this structure has initiated development towards a whole spectrum of fusion preventing drugs. In developing these drugs, researchers face challenges because the conformation that allows for inhibition occurs very quickly and then rearranges. Enfuviritide specifically has a low oral availability and is quickly processed and expelled by the body. Certain strains of HIV have also developed resistance to T-20. In order to circumvent the difficulties that come with using T-20, researchers have sought out peptide-based inhibitors. A variety of naturally occurring molecules have also been shown to bind gp41 and prevent HIV-1 entry.

The MPER is one region that has been studied as a potential target because of its ability to be recognized by broadly neutralizing antibodies (bNAbs), but it hasn't been a very good target because the immune response it elicits isn't very strong and because it is the portion of gp41 that enters the cell membrane (and it cannot be reached by antibodies then). In addition to antigen binding regions on MPER kinks, there are other targets that could prove to be effective antigen binding regions, including the hydrophobic pockets of the NHR core that is formed following the conformational change in gp41 that creates the six-helix bundle. These pockets could potentially serve as targets for small molecule inhibitors. The fusion peptide on the N-terminus of the gp41 is also a potential target because it contains neutralizing antibody epitopes. N36 and C34, or NHR- and CHR-based peptides (or short sequences of amino acids that mimic portions of gp41) can also act as effective antigens because of their high affinity binding. In addition to having a much higher affinity for binding when compared to its monomer, C34 also inhibits T-20 resistant HIV very well, which makes it a potentially good alternative to treatments involving enfuviritide. Small-molecule inhibitors that are able to bind to two hydrophobic pockets at once have also been shown to be 40-60 times more potent and have potential for further developments. Most recently, the gp120-gp41 interface is being considered as a target for bNAbs.
