= IU1 =

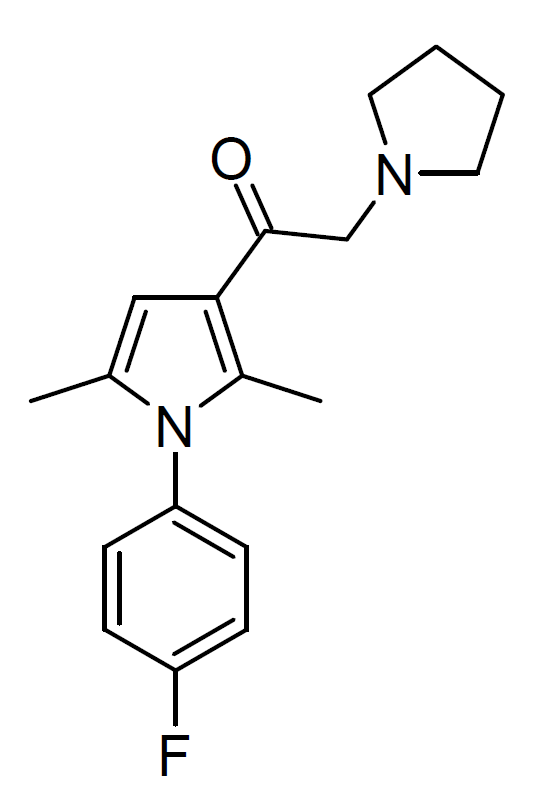

Identifiers
- IUPAC name: 1-[1-(4-fluorophenyl)-2,5-dimethylpyrrol-3-yl]-2-pyrrolidin-1-ylethanone
- CAS Number: 314245-33-5
- PubChem CID: 675434
- ChEBI: CHEBI:232499
- ChEMBL: ChEMBL1410015
- CompTox Dashboard (EPA): DTXSID80350196

Chemical and physical data
- Formula: C_{18}H_{21}FN_{2}O
- Molar mass: 300.377 g·mol^{−1}
- 3D model (JSmol): Interactive image
- SMILES: CC1=CC(=C(N1C2=CC=C(C=C2)F)C)C(=O)CN3CCCC3
- InChI: InChI=1S/C18H21FN2O/c1-13-11-17(18(22)12-20-9-3-4-10-20)14(2)21(13)16-7-5-15(19)6-8-16/h5-8,11H,3-4,9-10,12H2,1-2H3; Key:JUWDSDKJBMFLHE-UHFFFAOYSA-N

IU1 is a drug used in scientific research which acts as a selective inhibitor of the ubiquitin-specific processing protease enzyme USP14. It is of interest in anti-cancer and antiviral research and also as a potential anti-aging drug. Numerous derivatives of IU1 have been developed with up to 10x the potency of IU1 as USP14 inhibitors, but IU1 remains the most widely used compound in research in this area.
