= Myelokathexis =

- Specialty: Hematology

Myelokathexis is a congenital disorder of the white blood cells that causes severe, chronic leukopenia (a reduction of circulating white blood cells) and neutropenia (a reduction of neutrophil granulocytes). The disorder is believed to be inherited in an autosomal dominant manner. Myelokathexis refers to retention (kathexis) of neutrophils in the bone marrow (myelo). The disorder shows prominent neutrophil morphologic abnormalities.

Myelokathexis is amongst the diseases treated with bone marrow transplantation and cord blood stem cells. WHIM syndrome is a very rare variant of severe congenital neutropenia that presents with warts, hypogammaglobunemia, infections, and myelokathexis. A gain-of-function mutation resulting in a truncated form of CXCR4 is believed to be its cause. The truncated form of the receptor has a 2-fold increase in G-protein coupled intracellular signalling, and this mutation of the receptor can be identified by DNA sequencing.

== See also ==
- WHIM syndrome
