= Mavorixafor =

Chemical compound

Clinical data
- Trade names: Xolremdi
- Other names: X4P-001; AMD-070
- AHFS/Drugs.com: Monograph
- MedlinePlus: a624036
- License data: US DailyMed: Mavorixafor
- Routes of administration: By mouth
- Drug class: CXCR4 antagonist
- ATC code: L03AX24 (WHO)

Legal status
- Legal status: US: ℞-only; EU: Rx-only

Identifiers
- IUPAC name: N′-(1H-Benzimidazol-2-ylmethyl)-N′-[(8S)-5,6,7,8-tetrahydroquinolin-8-yl]butane-1,4-diamine
- CAS Number: 558447-26-0
- PubChem CID: 11256587
- IUPHAR/BPS: 8580
- DrugBank: DB05501
- ChemSpider: 9431613
- UNII: 0G9LGB5O2W
- KEGG: D11510
- ChEBI: CHEBI:138865
- ChEMBL: ChEMBL518924
- CompTox Dashboard (EPA): DTXSID60971247

Chemical and physical data
- Formula: C_{21}H_{27}N_{5}
- Molar mass: 349.482 g·mol^{−1}
- 3D model (JSmol): Interactive image
- SMILES: C1C[C@@H](C2=C(C1)C=CC=N2)N(CCCCN)CC3=NC4=CC=CC=C4N3
- InChI: InChI=1S/C21H27N5/c22-12-3-4-14-26(15-20-24-17-9-1-2-10-18(17)25-20)19-11-5-7-16-8-6-13-23-21(16)19/h1-2,6,8-10,13,19H,3-5,7,11-12,14-15,22H2,(H,24,25)/t19-/m0/s1; Key:WVLHHLRVNDMIAR-IBGZPJMESA-N

Mavorixafor, sold under the brand name Xolremdi, is a medication used for the treatment of WHIM syndrome. It is a CXC chemokine receptor 4 antagonist. It is taken by mouth. It was developed by X4 Pharmaceuticals.

The most frequently reported adverse reactions include thrombocytopenia (low platelet counts), rash, rhinitis (stuffy nose), epistaxis (nosebleed), vomiting, and dizziness.

Mavorixafor was approved for medical use in the United States in April 2024. The US Food and Drug Administration (FDA) considers it to be a first-in-class medication.

== Medical uses ==
Mavorixafor is indicated in people twelve years of age and older with WHIM syndrome (warts, hypogammaglobulinemia, infections and myelokathexis) to increase the number of circulating mature neutrophils and lymphocytes.

== History ==
The effectiveness of mavorixafor was evaluated in a 52-week, randomized, double-blind, placebo-controlled trial that enrolled 31 adolescents and adults with WHIM syndrome (NCT03995108). Mavorixafor improved absolute neutrophil counts and absolute lymphocyte counts, assessed over a 24-hour period four times throughout the study. Absolute neutrophil counts below 500 cells/μL and absolute lymphocyte counts below 1000 cells/μL are associated with an increased risk of infections. The average length of time over 24 hours that counts were above these levels was significantly longer with mavorixafor compared to the placebo group (15.0 hours compared to 2.8 hours for absolute neutrophil counts; 15.8 hours compared to 4.6 hours for absolute lymphocyte counts).

== Society and culture ==
=== Names ===
Mavorixafor is the international nonproprietary name.

== Research ==
Mavorixafor is in clinical trials for melanoma and renal cell carcinoma.
