= Envelope glycoprotein GP120 =

Glycoprotein exposed on the surface of the HIV virus

Envelope glycoprotein gp120

Identifiers
- Symbol: GP120
- Pfam: PF00516
- InterPro: IPR000777
- SCOP2: 1gc1 / SCOPe / SUPFAM
Available protein structures:
- PDB: IPR000777 PF00516 (ECOD; PDBsum)
- AlphaFold: IPR000777; PF00516

Envelope glycoprotein GP120 (or gp120) is a glycoprotein exposed on the surface of the HIV envelope. It was discovered by Professors Tun-Hou Lee and Myron "Max" Essex of the Harvard School of Public Health in 1984. The 120 in its name comes from its molecular weight of 120 kDa. Gp120 is essential for virus entry into cells as it plays a vital role in attachment to specific cell surface receptors. These receptors are DC-SIGN, Heparan Sulfate Proteoglycan and a specific interaction with the CD4 receptor, particularly on helper T-cells. Binding to CD4 induces the start of a cascade of conformational changes in gp120 and gp41 that lead to the fusion of the viral membrane with the host cell membrane. Binding to CD4 is mainly electrostatic although there are van der Waals interactions and hydrogen bonds.

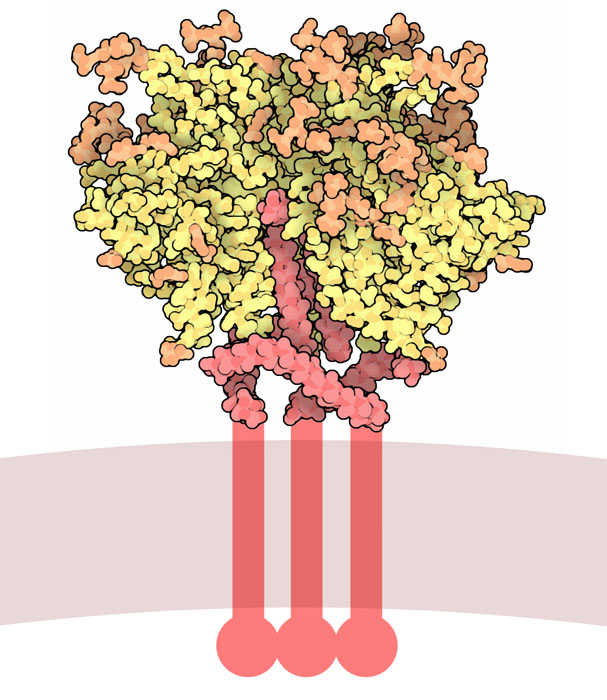
David Goodsell's illustration of HIV gp120, based on PDB: 4nco.

Gp120 is coded by the HIV env gene, which is around 2.5 kb long and codes for around 850 amino acids. The primary env product is the protein gp160, which gets cleaved to gp120 (~480 amino acids) and gp41 (~345 amino acids) in the endoplasmatic reticulum by the cellular protease furin. The crystal structure of core gp120 shows an organization with an outer domain, an inner domain with respect to its termini and a bridging sheet. Gp120 is anchored to the viral membrane, or envelope, via non-covalent bonds with the transmembrane glycoprotein, gp41. Three gp120s and gp41s combine in a trimer of heterodimers to form the envelope spike, which mediates attachment to and entry into the host cell.

== Variability ==
Since gp120 plays a vital role in the ability of HIV-1 to enter CD4^{+} cells, its evolution is of particular interest. Many neutralizing antibodies bind to sites located in variable regions of gp120, so mutations in these regions will be selected for strongly. The diversity of env has been shown to increase by 1-2% per year in HIV-1 group M and the variable units are notable for rapid changes in amino acid sequence length. Increases in gp120 variability result in significantly elevated levels of viral replication, indicating an increase in viral fitness in individuals infected by diverse HIV-1 variants. Further studies have shown that variability in potential N-linked glycosylation sites (PNGSs) also result in increased viral fitness. PNGSs allow for the binding of long-chain carbohydrates to the high variability regions of gp120, so the authors hypothesize that the number of PNGSs in env might affect the fitness of the virus by providing more or less sensitivity to neutralizing antibodies. The presence of large carbohydrate chains extending from gp120 might obscure possible antibody binding sites.

The boundaries of the potential to add and eliminate PNGSs are naively explored by growing viral populations following each new infection. While the transmitting host has developed a neutralizing antibody response to gp120, the newly infected host lacks immune recognition of the virus. Sequence data shows that initial viral variants in an immunologically naïve host have few glycosylation sites and shorter exposed variable loops. This may facilitate viral ability to bind host cell receptors. As the host immune system develops antibodies against gp120, immune pressures seem to select for increased glycosylation, particularly on the exposed variable loops of gp120. Consequently, insertions in env, which confer more PNGSs on gp120 may be more tolerated by the virus as higher glycan density promotes the viral ability to evade antibodies and thus promotes higher viral fitness. In considering how much PNGS density could theoretically change, there may be an upper bound to PNGS number due to its inhibition of gp120 folding, but if the PNGS number decreases substantially, then the virus is too easily detected by neutralizing antibodies. Therefore, a stabilizing selection balance between low and high glycan densities is likely established. A lower number of bulky glycans improves viral replication efficiency and higher number on the exposed loops aids host immune evasion via disguise.

The relationship between gp120 and neutralizing antibodies is an example of Red Queen evolutionary dynamics. Continuing evolutionary adaptation is required for the viral envelope protein to maintain fitness relative to the continuing evolutionary adaptations of the host immune neutralizing antibodies, and vice versa, forming a coevolving system.

=== V3 loop ===
The third variable loop or V3 loop is a part or region of the viron's envelope glycoprotein, gp120. It allows gp120 to infect human immune cells by binding to a cytokine receptor on the target human immune cell, such as a CCR5 cell or CXCR4 cell, depending on the strain of HIV.

The envelope glycoprotein (Env) gp 120/41 is essential for HIV-1 entry into cells. Env serves as a molecular target of a medicine treating individuals with HIV-1 infection, and a source of immunogen to develop AIDS vaccine. However, the structure of the functional Env trimer has remained elusive.

== Vaccine target ==
Since CD4 receptor binding is the most obvious step in HIV infection, gp120 was among the first targets of HIV vaccine research. Efforts to develop HIV vaccines targeting gp120, however, have been hampered by the chemical and structural properties of gp120, which make it difficult for antibodies to bind to it. gp120 can also easily be shed from the surface of the virus and captured by T cells due to its loose binding with gp41. A conserved region in the gp120 glycoprotein that is involved in the metastable attachment of gp120 to CD4 has been identified and targeting of invariant region has been achieved with a broadly neutralising antibody, IgG1-b12.

NIH research published in Science reports the isolation of 3 antibodies that neutralize 90% of HIV-1 strains at the CD4bs region of gp120, potentially offering a therapeutic and vaccine strategy. However, most antibodies that bind the CDbs region of gp120 do not neutralize HIV, and rare ones that do such as IgG1-b12 have unusual properties such as asymmetry of the Fab arms or in their positioning. Unless a gp120-based vaccine can be designed to elicit antibodies with strongly neutralizing antiviral properties, there is concern that breakthrough infection leading to humoral production of high levels of non-neutralizing antibodies targeting the CD4 binding site of gp120 is associated with faster disease progression to AIDS.

== Competition ==
The protein gp120 is necessary during the initial binding of HIV to its target cell. Consequently, anything which binds to gp120 or its targets can physically block gp120 from binding to a cell. Only one such agent, Maraviroc, which binds the co-receptor CCR5 is currently licensed and in clinical use. No agent targeting gp120's main first cellular interaction partner, CD4, is currently licensed since interfering with such a central molecule of the immune system can cause toxic side effects, such as the anti-CD4 monoclonal antibody OKT4. Targeting gp120 itself has proven extremely difficult due to its high degree of variability and shielding. Fostemsavir (BMS-663068) is a methyl phosphate prodrug of the small molecule inhibitor BMS-626529, which prevents viral entry by binding to the viral envelope gp120 and interfering with virus attachment to the host CD4 receptor.

== HIV dementia ==
The HIV viral protein gp120 induces apoptosis of neuronal cells by inhibiting levels of furin and tissue plasminogen activator, enzymes responsible for converting pBDNF to mBDNF. gp120 induces mitochondrial-death proteins like caspases which may influence the upregulation of the death receptor Fas leading to apoptosis of neuronal cells, gp120 induces oxidative stress in the neuronal cells, and it is also known to activate STAT1 and induce interleukins IL-6 and IL-8 secretion in neuronal cells.

== See also ==
- HIV envelope gene
- HIV entry to the cell
- gp41
- CD4
- CCR5
- Entry inhibitor
- Structure and genome of HIV
