= Broad-spectrum chemokine inhibitor =

Drug class

A broad-spectrum chemokine inhibitor (BSCI), also termed chemotide or somatotaxin, is a type of experimental anti-inflammatory drug that inhibits the action of the pro-inflammatory proteins chemokines. Radiolabeling experiments performed by Dr. David Fox, University of Warwick, demonstrated the ability of the BSCI to bind and antagonize the somatostatin receptor 2 (SSTR2). This is a display of functional selectivity at the SSTR2 receptor. Functional selectivity is the effect of one ligand having one agonism when bound to the receptor and another ligand having a different agonism at that same receptor.

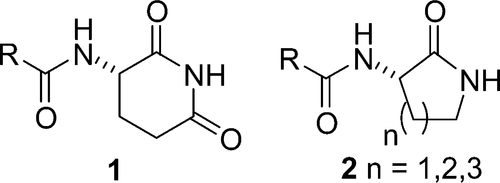
Previous broad spectrum chemokine inhibitors.

== Early peptides ==
The observation that the chemokine CCL2 is potentially responsible for the recruitment of macrophages to atherosclerotic lesions initiated a campaign of research into the a class of molecules that would inhibit the trafficking of leukocytes and act as a new generation of anti-inflammatory agents. ‘Peptide 3’, a dodecapeptide section of CCL2, designed as an allosteric inhibitor of MCP-1 induced leukocyte chemotaxis, was quickly shown by leukocyte migration assay to be a functional inhibitor of many chemokines in vitro with similar potency. The potency of this peptide could be increased by cyclisation and the use of the reverse sequence of D-amino acids. This peptide is called NR58-3.14.3.

=== In vivo anti-inflammatory activity ===
The cyclic peptide NR58-3.14.3 was shown to be a powerful anti-inflammatory agent in vivo, inhibiting inflammation in a number of disease models such as atherosclerosis, ischemia, lung disease, surgical adhesions, endometriosis and pulmonary graft-versus-host disease. It has been suggested that blockage of chemokine function using these molecules should not have a detrimental toxicological effect.

=== Anti-HIV activity ===
Cyclic peptide NR58-3.14.3 has also been shown to inhibit HIV replication.

=== Preterm Labor ===
The BSCI compound called 'BN83470' in pregnant mice averted infection-induced preterm birth (PTB) by blocking various inflammatory pathways in the uterus and preventing the infiltration of immune cells into the uterine myometrium. In a nonhuman primate model of Group B Streptococcus (GBS)-induced preterm labour, another BSCI compound called 'FX125L' was able to inhibit preterm labour and suppress the cytokine response. No antibiotics were administered during these experiments, allowing the GBS infection to progress and invade the amniotic cavity and the fetus. Despite the invasive GBS infection, prophylactic BSCI treatment significantly reduced the levels of cytokines in the amniotic fluid, fetal plasma, lung, and brain, indicating its ability to suppress the inflammatory response. Current animal studies have not shown any significant fetal toxicity associated with BSCI compounds. However, further research, particularly through human pre-clinical trials, is now underway to understand the impact of BSCIs on the fetal immune response and development.

== Small molecule drug candidates ==
The key amino acids of the BSCI peptides required for activity have been identified, and the tripeptide AcNH-Trp-Val-Gln-OH was shown to itself be a BSCI in the low micromolar range. Based on this structure a number of peptide mimetics were designed, including a range of 3-acylaminoglutarimides, with low nanomolar BSCI potencies. The search for increased stability and potency led to the development of 3-acylaminolactams, with picomolar potencies in vitro and high anti-inflammatory activity in vivo. A small molecule member of this class of BSCIs called FX125L, under development by Funxional Therapeutics, has recently completed phase 2 clinical trials.
