= VLX1570 =

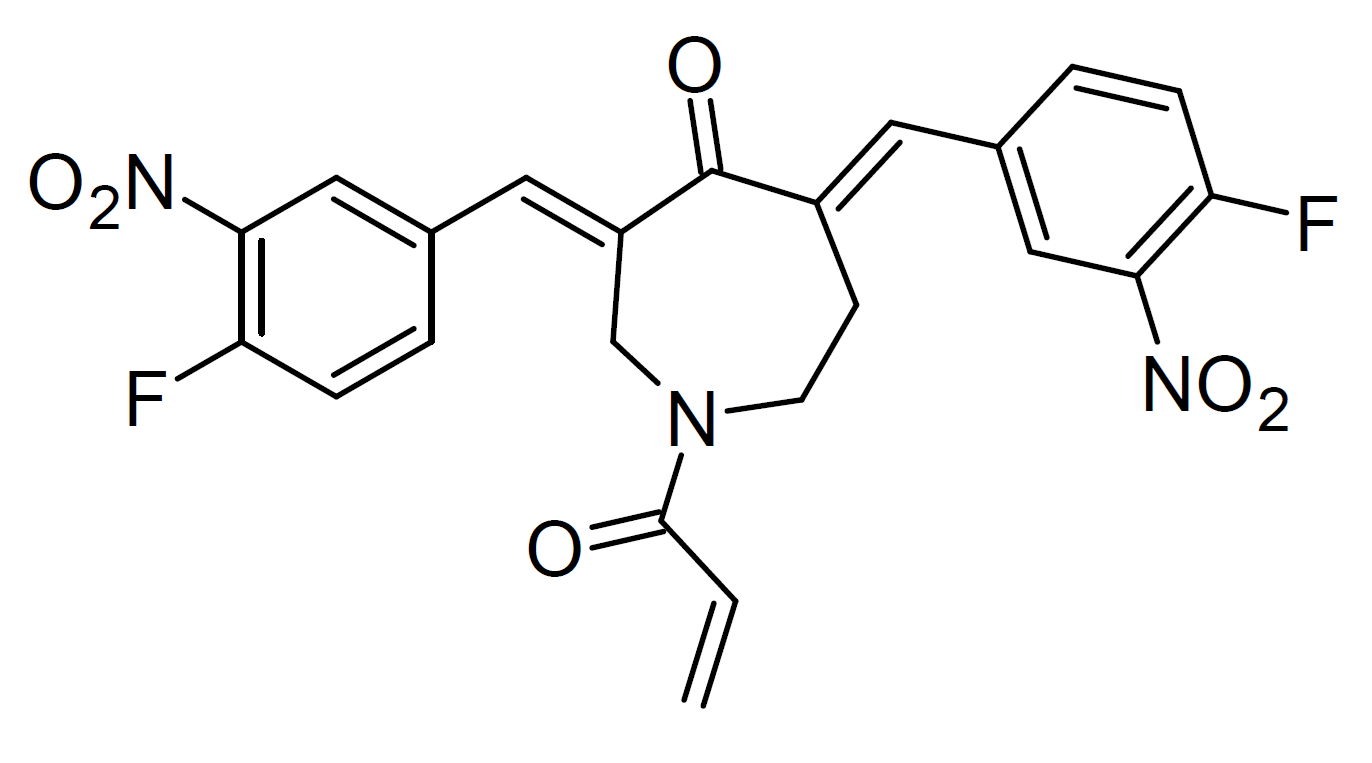

Identifiers
- IUPAC name: (3E,5E)-3,5-bis[(4-fluoro-3-nitrophenyl)methylidene]-1-prop-2-enoylazepan-4-one
- CAS Number: 1956378-23-6
- PubChem CID: 71523377
- UNII: K6067N5M6N

Chemical and physical data
- Formula: C_{23}H_{17}F_{2}N_{3}O_{6}
- Molar mass: 469.401 g·mol^{−1}
- 3D model (JSmol): Interactive image
- SMILES: C=CC(=O)N1CC/C(=C\C2=CC(=C(C=C2)F)[N+](=O)[O-])/C(=O)/C(=C/C3=CC(=C(C=C3)F)[N+](=O)[O-])/C1
- InChI: InChI=1S/C23H17F2N3O6/c1-2-22(29)26-8-7-16(9-14-3-5-18(24)20(11-14)27(31)32)23(30)17(13-26)10-15-4-6-19(25)21(12-15)28(33)34/h2-6,9-12H,1,7-8,13H2/b16-9+,17-10+; Key:SCKXBVLYWLLALY-CZCYGEDCSA-N

VLX1570 is a drug used in scientific research which acts as a non selective inhibitor of proteasome deubiquitinases. It has potential applications in the treatment of cancer, though was discontinued in clinical trials due to excessive toxicity.
