= Degrasyn =

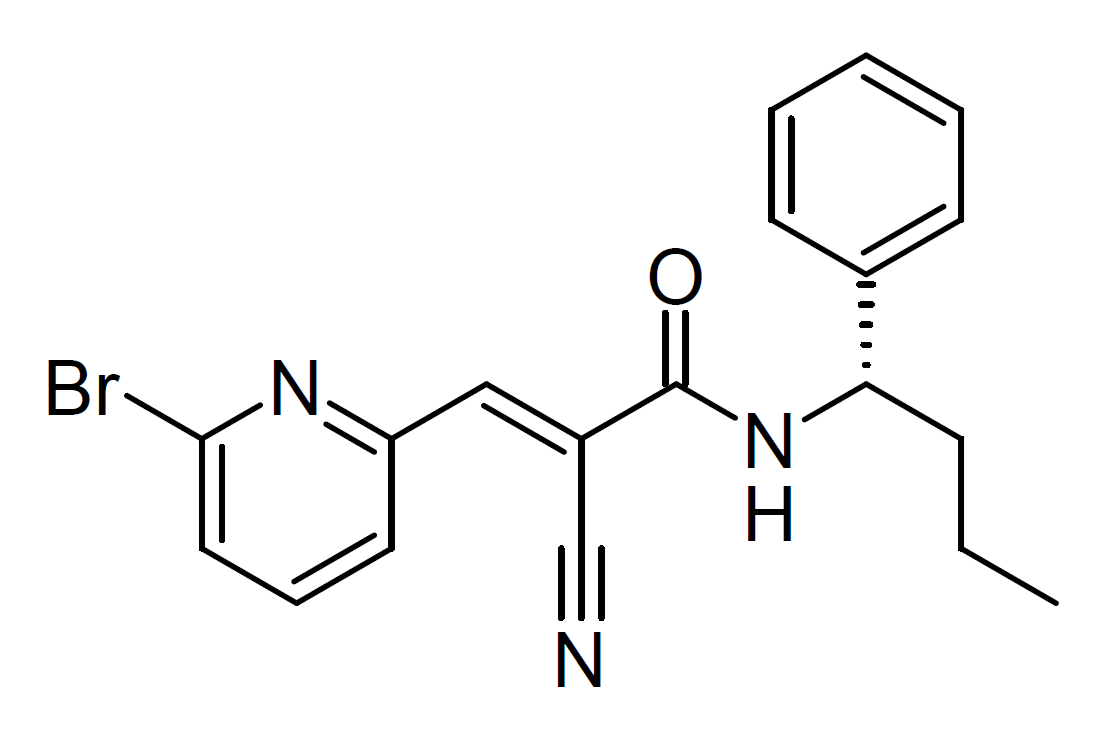

Identifiers
- IUPAC name: (E)-3-(6-bromo-2-pyridinyl)-2-cyano-N-[(1S)-1-phenylbutyl]prop-2-enamide
- CAS Number: 856243-80-6
- PubChem CID: 11222830
- CompTox Dashboard (EPA): DTXSID50459281

Chemical and physical data
- Formula: C_{19}H_{18}BrN_{3}O
- Molar mass: 384.277 g·mol^{−1}
- 3D model (JSmol): Interactive image
- SMILES: CCC[C@@H](C1=CC=CC=C1)NC(=O)/C(=C/C2=NC(=CC=C2)Br)/C#N
- InChI: InChI=1S/C19H18BrN3O/c1-2-7-17(14-8-4-3-5-9-14)23-19(24)15(13-21)12-16-10-6-11-18(20)22-16/h3-6,8-12,17H,2,7H2,1H3,(H,23,24)/b15-12+/t17-/m0/s1; Key:LIDOPKHSVQTSJY-VMEIHUARSA-N

Degrasyn (WP1130) is a drug used in scientific research which acts as a non-selective inhibitor of proteasome deubiquitinases. It has antiviral properties, and potential applications in the treatment of cancer.
