= D75-4590 =

Names
- IUPAC name 1-{[2-(Diethylamino)ethyl]amino}-2-ethyl-3-methylpyrido[1,2-a]benzimidazole-4-carbonitrile
- Other names 4-[2-(Diethylamino)ethylamino]-3-ethyl-2-methyl-4a,9-diaza-3,4-dihydrofluorene-1-carbonitrile

Identifiers
CAS Number	384376-42-5
3D model (JSmol)	Interactive image
ChEBI	CHEBI:761219
ChEMBL	ChEMBL1171572
ChemSpider	824252
PubChem CID	948175
UNII	PS449L7PJY
CompTox Dashboard (EPA)	DTXSID201045514
- InChI: InChI=1S/C21H27N5/c1-5-16-15(4)17(14-22)21-24-18-10-8-9-11-19(18)26(21)20(16)23-12-13-25(6-2)7-3/h8-11,23H,5-7,12-13H2,1-4H3 Key: DMKNXKIUSPUYQP-UHFFFAOYSA-N
- SMILES: CCc1c(c(c2nc3ccccc3n2c1NCCN(CC)CC)C#N)C

Properties
Chemical formula	C_{21}H_{27}N_{5}
Molar mass	349.473 g/mol
- Except where otherwise noted, data are given for materials in their standard state (at 25 °C [77 °F], 100 kPa). Infobox references

D75-4590 is an antifungal pyridobenzimidazole derivative that inhibits β-glucan synthesis. D11-2040 and D21-6076 are antifungal derivatives of D75-4590.
