= Stromal cell-derived factor 1 =

Mammalian protein found in Homo sapiens

CXCL12
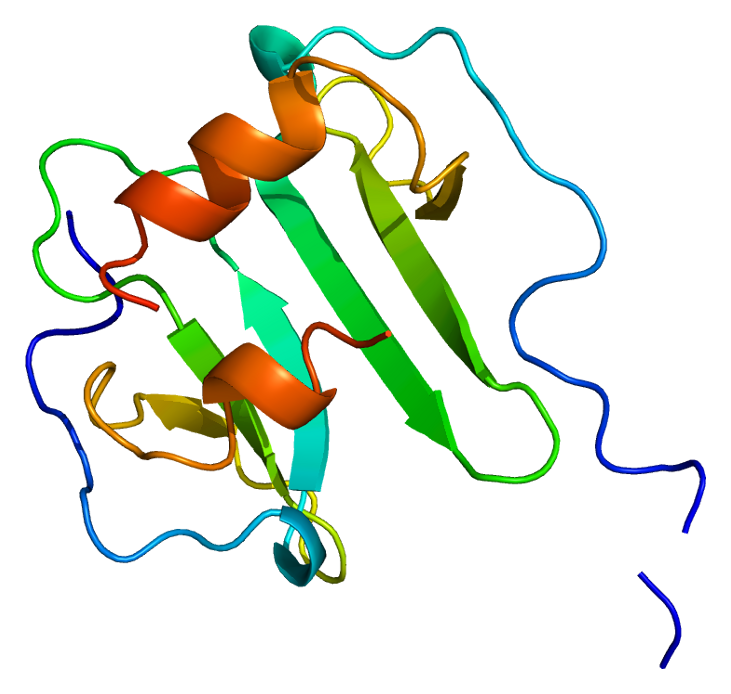

Identifiers
- Aliases: CXCL12, IRH, PBSF, SCYB12, SDF1, TLSF, TPAR1, C-X-C motif chemokine ligand 12
- External IDs: OMIM: 600835; MGI: 103556; GeneCards: CXCL12
Available structures
PDB	Ortholog search: PDBe RCSB
PDB	List of PDB id codes 1A15, 1QG7, 1SDF, 1VMC, 2J7Z, 2K01, 2K03, 2K04, 2K05, 2KEC, 2KED, 2KEE, 2KOL, 2NWG, 2SDF, 3GV3, 3HP3, 4LMQ, 4UAI, 2N55

Gene location (Human)
Chr.	Chromosome 10 (human)
Band	10q11.21	Start	44,370,165 bp
Band	10q11.21	End	44,386,493 bp

Gene location (Mouse)
Chr.	Chromosome 6 (mouse)
Band	6 54.81 cM|6 F1	Start	117,145,496 bp
Band	6 54.81 cM|6 F1	End	117,158,328 bp
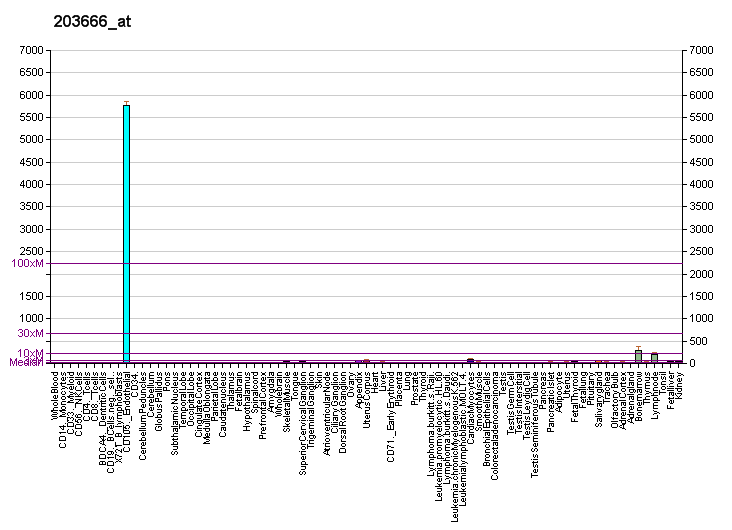

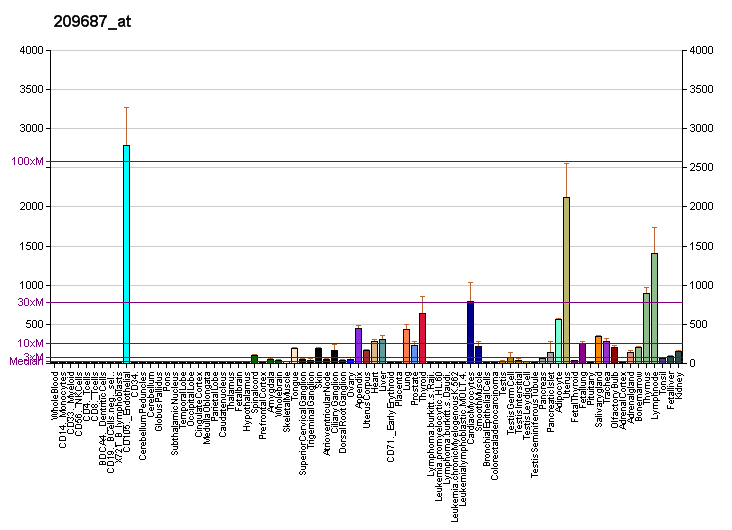
RNA expression pattern
Bgee	Human / Mouse (ortholog); Top expressed in: synovial joint; pericardium; lactiferous duct; skin of hip; trabecular bone; parietal pleura; synovial membrane; superficial temporal artery; gallbladder; vena cava / Top expressed in: stroma of bone marrow; tibiofemoral joint; Gonadal ridge; vas deferens; internal carotid artery; spleen; ankle; ankle joint; external carotid artery; thymus; More reference expression data
BioGPS	More reference expression data
Gene ontology
Molecular function	chemokine receptor binding; cytokine activity; chemokine activity; CXCR chemokine receptor binding; chemoattractant activity; growth factor activity; signaling receptor binding; integrin binding; protein binding
Cellular component	plasma membrane; extracellular region; extracellular exosome; external side of plasma membrane; extracellular space; cytoplasm; nucleus; collagen-containing extracellular matrix
Biological process	negative regulation of leukocyte tethering or rolling; G protein-coupled receptor signaling pathway; regulation of calcium ion transport; response to hypoxia; positive regulation of endothelial cell proliferation; positive regulation of cell migration; chemokine-mediated signaling pathway; adult locomotory behavior; response to mechanical stimulus; response to peptide hormone; positive regulation of monocyte chemotaxis; cellular calcium ion homeostasis; response to virus; neuron migration; response to heat; negative regulation of intrinsic apoptotic signaling pathway in response to DNA damage; positive regulation of axon extension involved in axon guidance; blood circulation; telencephalon cell migration; chemotaxis; regulation of actin polymerization or depolymerization; positive regulation of calcium ion import; brain development; cell adhesion; positive regulation of dopamine secretion; animal organ regeneration; positive regulation of neuron differentiation; immune response; positive regulation of cell population proliferation; cell chemotaxis; negative regulation of leukocyte apoptotic process; response to radiation; positive regulation of T cell migration; positive regulation of cell adhesion; signal transduction; positive chemotaxis; induction of positive chemotaxis; defense response; response to ultrasound; antimicrobial humoral immune response mediated by antimicrobial peptide; T cell chemotaxis; detection of temperature stimulus involved in sensory perception of pain; detection of mechanical stimulus involved in sensory perception of pain; regulation of signaling receptor activity; axon guidance; viral process; integrin activation; chemokine (C-X-C motif) ligand 12 signaling pathway; cellular response to chemokine; negative regulation of dendritic cell apoptotic process
Sources:Amigo / QuickGO
Orthologs
Databases	NCBI: entry; OMA: entry
Species	Human	Mouse
Entrez	6387	20315
Ensembl	ENSG00000107562	ENSMUSG00000061353
UniProt	P48061	P40224
RefSeq (mRNA)	NM_199168; NM_000609; NM_001033886; NM_001178134; NM_001277990	NM_001012477; NM_013655; NM_021704
RefSeq (protein)	NP_000600; NP_001029058; NP_001171605; NP_001264919; NP_954637	NP_001012495; NP_038683; NP_068350
Location (UCSC)	Chr 10: 44.37 – 44.39 Mb	Chr 6: 117.15 – 117.16 Mb
PubMed search
- Wikidata
View/Edit Human	View/Edit Mouse

The stromal cell-derived factor 1 (SDF-1), also known as C-X-C motif chemokine 12 (CXCL12), is a chemokine protein that in humans is encoded by the CXCL12 gene on chromosome 10. It is ubiquitously expressed in many tissues and cell types. Stromal cell-derived factors 1-alpha and 1-beta are small cytokines that belong to the chemokine family, members of which activate leukocytes and are often induced by proinflammatory stimuli such as lipopolysaccharide, TNF, or IL1. The chemokines are characterized by the presence of 4 conserved cysteines that form 2 disulfide bonds. They can be classified into 2 subfamilies. In the CC subfamily, the cysteine residues are adjacent to each other. In the CXC subfamily, they are separated by an intervening amino acid. The SDF1 proteins belong to the latter group. CXCL12 signaling has been observed in several cancers. The CXCL12 gene also contains one of 27 SNPs associated with increased risk of coronary artery disease.

== Structure ==
=== Gene ===
The CXCL12 gene resides on chromosome 10 at the band 10q11.21 and contains 4 exons. This gene produces 7 isoforms through alternative splicing.

=== Protein ===
This protein belongs to the intercrine alpha (chemokine CXC) family. SDF-1 is produced in two forms, SDF-1α/CXCL12a and SDF-1β/CXCL12b, by alternate splicing of the same gene. Chemokines are characterized by the presence of four conserved cysteines, which form two disulfide bonds. The CXCL12 proteins belong to the group of CXC chemokines, whose initial pair of cysteines are separated by one intervening amino acid. In addition, the first 8 residues of the CXCL12 N-terminal serve as a receptor binding site, though only Lys-1 and Pro-2 directly participated in activating the receptor. Meanwhile, the RFFESH motif (residues 12-17) in the loop region function as a docking site for CXCL12 receptor binding.

== Function ==
CXCL12 is expressed in many tissues in mice including brain, thymus, heart, lung, liver, kidney, spleen, platelets and bone marrow. CXCL12 is strongly chemotactic for lymphocytes. During embryogenesis, it directs the migration of hematopoietic cells from fetal liver to bone marrow and the formation of large blood vessels. It has also been shown that CXCL12 signalling regulates the expression of CD20 on B cells. CXCL12 is also chemotactic for mesenchymal stem cells and is expressed in the area of inflammatory bone destruction, where it mediates their suppressive effect on osteoclastogenesis.

In adulthood, CXCL12 plays an important role in angiogenesis by recruiting endothelial progenitor cells (EPCs) from the bone marrow through a CXCR4 dependent mechanism.

CXCR4, previously called LESTR or fusin, is the receptor for CXCL12. This CXCL12-CXCR4 interaction used to be considered exclusive (unlike for other chemokines and their receptors), but recently, it was suggested that CXCL12 may also bind the CXCR7 receptor (now called ACKR3). By blocking CXCR4, a major coreceptor for HIV-1 entry, CXCL12 acts as an endogenous inhibitor of CXCR4-tropic HIV-1 strains.

=== CNS ===
During embryonic development, CXCL12 plays a role in cerebellar formation through the migration of neurons. Within the CNS, CXCL12 contributes to cell proliferation, neurogenesis (nervous tissue development and growth), as well as neuroinflammation. Neural progenitor cells (NPCs) are stem cells that differentiate into glial and neuronal cells. CXCL12 promotes their migration to lesion sites within the brain, specifically over extensive ranges. Once at the site of damage, NPCs may begin stem cell based tissue repair to the lesion. The CXCL12/CXCR4 axis provides guidance cues for axons and neurites hence promoting neurite outgrowth (neurons forming projections) and neurogenesis. Like other chemokines, CXCL12 is involved with cell migration that contributes to inflammation. In regards to the CNS, CXCL12 plays a role in neuroinflammation by attracting leukocytes across the blood brain barrier. however, excessive production and accumulation of CXCL12 can become toxic and the inflammation produced may result in serious consequences.

== Clinical significance ==
In humans, CXCL12 has been implicated in a wide variety of biomedical conditions involving several organ systems. Furthermore, CXCL12 signaling in conjunction with CXCR7 signaling has been implicated in the progression of pancreatic cancer. In the urinary tract system, methylation of the CXCL12 promoter and expression of PD-L1 may be powerful prognostic biomarkers for biochemical recurrence in prostate carcinoma patients after radical prostatectomy, and further studies are ongoing to confirm if CXCL12 methylation may aid in active surveillance strategies. In the field of oncology, melanoma associated fibroblasts are stimulated by stimulation of the A2B adenosine receptor followed by stimulation of fibroblast growth factor and increased expression of CXCL12.

=== Clinical marker ===
A multi-locus genetic risk score study based on a combination of 27 loci, including the CXCL12 gene, identified individuals at increased risk for both incident and recurrent coronary artery disease events, as well as an enhanced clinical benefit from statin therapy. The study was based on a community cohort study (the Malmo Diet and Cancer study) and four additional randomized controlled trials of primary prevention cohorts (JUPITER and ASCOT) and secondary prevention cohorts (CARE and PROVE IT-TIMI 22).

=== Multiple sclerosis ===
A neurological condition that results from a faulty interaction between the immune and nervous systems in multiple sclerosis. MS is characterized by demyelination of nerves due to the body's immune system attacking the CNS. Elevated levels of CXCL12 are observed in the cerebral spinal fluid of patients with MS. CXCL12 crosses the blood–brain barrier and causes neuroinflammation that contributes to axonal damage and therefore the progression of multiple sclerosis.

=== Alzheimer's disease ===
Though CXCL12 may be detrimental for those with MS, recent research is suggesting that this chemokine may be beneficial in decreasing the progression of patients with Alzheimer's. Alzheimer's is another neurological condition and the most common form of dementia where cognition significantly declines. One main characteristic of Alzheimer's is the accumulation of a brain plaque known as beta-amyloid. There are neuroprotective aspects of CXCL12 in mice with these plaques/Alzheimer's. PAK is a protein associated with maintaining dendritic spines, which are essential at synapses in receiving information from axons. Mislocalization of PAK occurs in patients with Alzheimer's, however pretreatment of neurons in mice with CXCL12 showed a suppression of that mislocalization. Additionally, this pretreatment with CXCL decreased the prevalence of apoptosis and oxidative damage normally caused by the presence of the beta-amyloid plaque.

=== As a drug target ===
Chemokines and chemokine receptors, of which CXCR stands out, regulate multiple processes such as morphogenesis, angiogenesis, and immune responses and are considered potential targets for drug development. It is indicated by clinical samples that a high expression level of CXCR4 in idiopathic pulmonary fibrosis lungs. Experimental evidence further indicate that CXCR4/CXCR12 is associated with the pathogenesis of lung fibrosis. In the gastrointestinal tract system, the CXCL12-CXCR4 axis is under investigation as an anti-fibrotic therapy in the treatment for chronic pancreatitis. For instance, blocking CXCR4, the receptor for CXCL12, with Plerixafor (AMD-3100) increased the effectiveness of combretastatin in a mouse model of breast cancer, presumably by preventing macrophages from being recruited to tumours.[15][16] AMD-3100 is also widely used in combination with G-CSF for mobilizing hematopoietic stem cells into the blood stream, allowing collection for bone marrow transplant.

Topical treatments frequently fail because the proteolytic microenvironment of chronic wounds degrades therapeutic agents. Under these conditions, stromal cell-derived factor 1 (SDF-1), also known as CXCL12, which is essential for tissue repair, is highly susceptible to proteolysis and inactivation by proteases such as dipeptidyl peptidase IV (DPPIV)/CD26, neutrophil elastase, cathepsin G, and various metalloproteinases. Rapid degradation of CXCL12 impairs the homing and mobilization of stem and progenitor cells, thereby inhibiting angiogenesis and neovascularization.
