= CXCR4 =

Protein

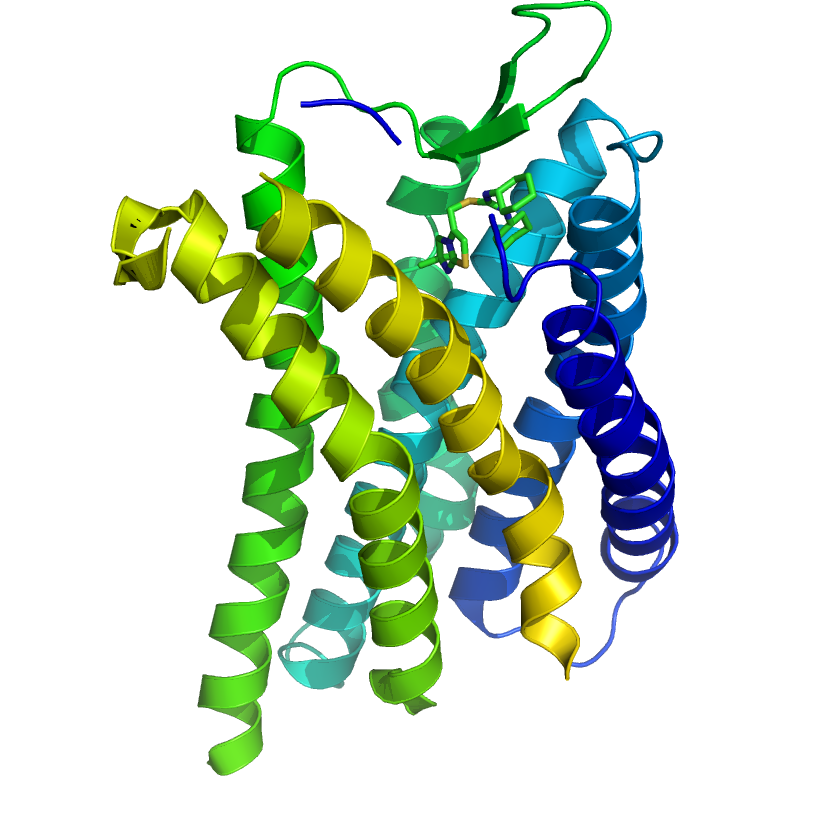

Identifiers
- Aliases: CXCR4, CD184, D2S201E, FB22, HM89, HSY3RR, LAP-3, LAP3, LCR1, LESTR, NPY3R, NPYR, NPYRL, NPYY3R, WHIM, WHIMS, C-X-C motif chemokine receptor 4, WHIMS1
- External IDs: OMIM: 162643; MGI: 109563; GeneCards: CXCR4
Available structures
PDB	Ortholog search: PDBe RCSB
PDB	List of PDB id codes 4RWS, 2K03, 2K04, 2K05, 3ODU, 3OE0, 3OE6, 3OE8, 3OE9, 2N55

Gene location (Human)
Chr.	Chromosome 2 (human)
Band	2q22.1	Start	136,114,349 bp
Band	2q22.1	End	136,119,177 bp

Gene location (Mouse)
Chr.	Chromosome 1 (mouse)
Band	1 E4|1 56.43 cM	Start	128,515,936 bp
Band	1 E4|1 56.43 cM	End	128,520,030 bp
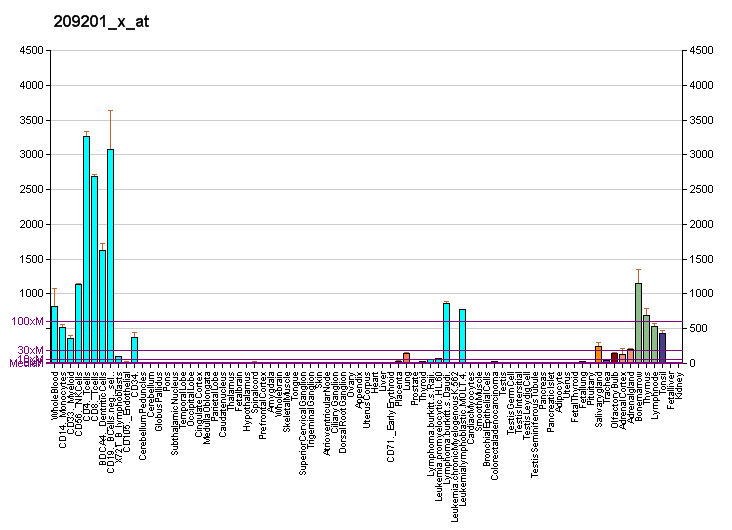

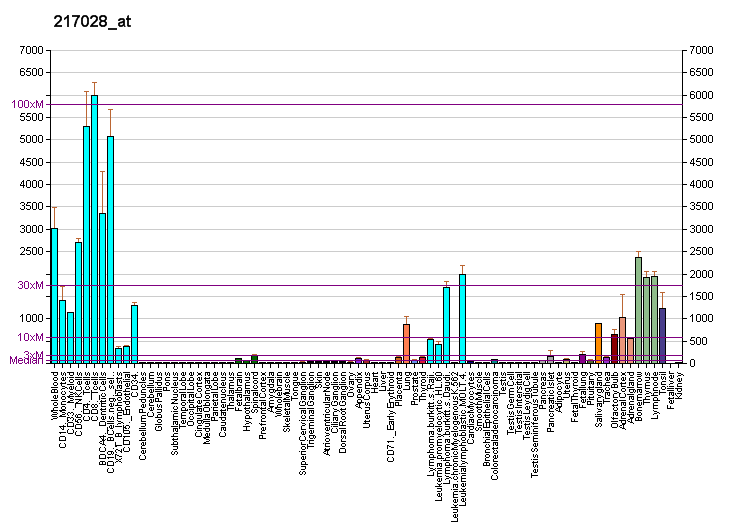

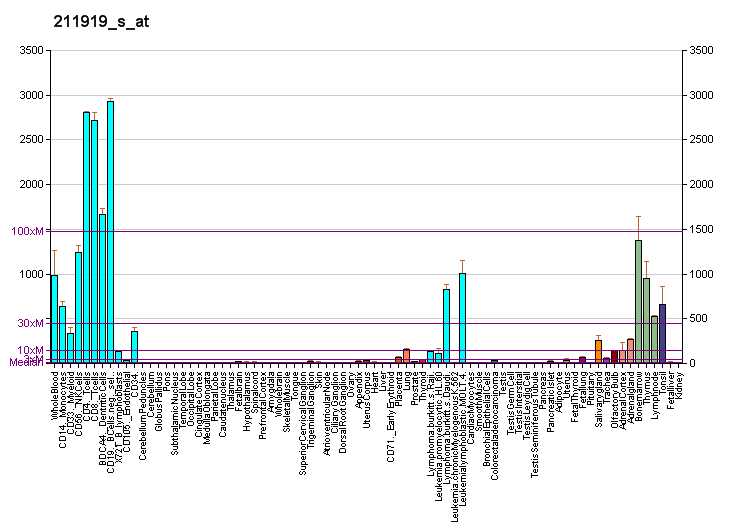
RNA expression pattern
Bgee	Human / Mouse (ortholog); Top expressed in: bone marrow; thymus; epithelium of nasopharynx; lymph node; appendix; bone marrow cell; blood; spleen; visceral pleura; trabecular bone / Top expressed in: granulocyte; thymus; tibiofemoral joint; spleen; stroma of bone marrow; mesenteric lymph nodes; blood; aortic valve; lumbar spinal ganglion; right lung lobe; More reference expression data
BioGPS	More reference expression data
Gene ontology
Molecular function	cytokine binding; coreceptor activity; virus receptor activity; signal transducer activity; protein binding; chemokine receptor activity; myosin light chain binding; actin binding; ubiquitin protein ligase binding; G protein-coupled receptor activity; C-X-C chemokine receptor activity; ubiquitin binding; C-C chemokine binding; C-C chemokine receptor activity; chemokine binding; C-X-C motif chemokine 12 receptor activity
Cellular component	cytoplasm; integral component of membrane; endosome; membrane; cell surface; cell junction; cell leading edge; extracellular exosome; cytoplasmic vesicle; early endosome; late endosome; lysosome; plasma membrane; external side of plasma membrane; protein-containing complex; nucleus
Biological process	myelin maintenance; positive regulation of oligodendrocyte differentiation; response to hypoxia; positive regulation of cytosolic calcium ion concentration; chemokine-mediated signaling pathway; response to virus; dendritic cell chemotaxis; cellular response to cytokine stimulus; chemotaxis; inflammatory response; calcium-mediated signaling; signal transduction; apoptotic process; viral process; fusion of virus membrane with host plasma membrane; regulation of chemotaxis; G protein-coupled receptor signaling pathway; axon guidance; immune response; brain development; neurogenesis; CXCL12-activated CXCR4 signaling pathway; cell chemotaxis; positive regulation of cold-induced thermogenesis; regulation of cell adhesion; neuron migration; epithelial cell development; neuron recognition; response to activity; cell migration; telencephalon cell migration; positive regulation of cell migration; positive regulation of vascular wound healing; regulation of programmed cell death; response to morphine; endothelial cell differentiation; positive regulation of neurogenesis; regulation of viral process; positive regulation of chemotaxis; detection of temperature stimulus involved in sensory perception of pain; detection of mechanical stimulus involved in sensory perception of pain; regulation of calcium ion transport; cardiac muscle contraction; endothelial tube morphogenesis; positive regulation of dendrite extension; positive regulation of mesenchymal stem cell migration; response to ultrasound
Sources:Amigo / QuickGO
Orthologs
Databases	NCBI: entry; OMA: entry
Species	Human	Mouse
Entrez	7852	12767
Ensembl	ENSG00000121966	ENSMUSG00000045382
UniProt	P61073	P70658
RefSeq (mRNA)	NM_003467; NM_001008540; NM_001348056; NM_001348059; NM_001348060	NM_009911; NM_001356509
RefSeq (protein)	NP_001008540; NP_003458; NP_001334985; NP_001334988; NP_001334989	NP_034041; NP_001343438
Location (UCSC)	Chr 2: 136.11 – 136.12 Mb	Chr 1: 128.52 – 128.52 Mb
PubMed search
- Wikidata
View/Edit Human	View/Edit Mouse

C-X-C chemokine receptor type 4 (CXCR-4) also known as fusin or CD184 (cluster of differentiation 184) is a protein that in humans is encoded by the CXCR4 gene. The protein is a CXC chemokine receptor.

== Function ==
CXCR-4 is an alpha-chemokine receptor specific for stromal-derived-factor-1 (SDF-1 also called CXCL12), a molecule endowed with potent chemotactic activity for lymphocytes. CXCR4 is one of several chemokine co-receptors that HIV can use to infect CD4+ T cells. HIV isolates that use CXCR4 are traditionally known as T-cell tropic isolates. Typically, these viruses are found late in infection. It is unclear as to whether the emergence of CXCR4-using HIV is a consequence or a cause of immunodeficiency.

CXCR4 is upregulated during the implantation window in natural and hormone replacement therapy cycles in the endometrium, producing, in presence of a human blastocyst, a surface polarization of the CXCR4 receptors suggesting that this receptor is implicated in the adhesion phase of human implantation.

CXCR4's ligand SDF-1 is known to be important in hematopoietic stem cell homing to the bone marrow and in hematopoietic stem cell quiescence. It has been also shown that CXCR4 signalling regulates the expression of CD20 on B cells. Until recently, SDF-1 and CXCR4 were believed to be a relatively monogamous ligand-receptor pair (other chemokines are promiscuous, tending to use several different chemokine receptors). Recent evidence demonstrates ubiquitin is also a natural ligand of CXCR4. Ubiquitin is a small (76-amino acid) protein highly conserved among eukaryotic cells. It is best known for its intracellular role in targeting ubiquitylated proteins for degradation via the ubiquitin proteasome system. Evidence in numerous animal models suggests ubiquitin is anti-inflammatory immune modulator and endogenous opponent of proinflammatory damage associated molecular pattern molecules. It is speculated this interaction may be through CXCR4 mediated signalling pathways. MIF is an additional ligand of CXCR4.

CXCR4 is present in newly generated neurons during embryogenesis and adult life where it plays a role in neuronal guidance. The levels of the receptor decrease as neurons mature. CXCR4 mutant mice have aberrant neuronal distribution. This has been implicated in disorders such as epilepsy.

CXCR4 dimerization is dynamic and increases with concentration.

== Clinical significance ==
Drugs that block the CXCR4 receptor appear to be capable of "mobilizing" hematopoietic stem cells into the bloodstream as peripheral blood stem cells. Peripheral blood stem cell mobilization is very important in hematopoietic stem cell transplantation (as a recent alternative to transplantation of surgically harvested bone marrow) and is currently performed using drugs such as G-CSF. G-CSF is a growth factor for neutrophils (a common type of white blood cells), and may act by increasing the activity of neutrophil-derived proteases such as neutrophil elastase in the bone marrow leading to proteolytic degradation of SDF-1. Plerixafor (AMD3100) is a drug, approved for routine clinical use, which directly blocks the CXCR4 receptor. It is a very efficient inducer of hematopoietic stem cell mobilization in animal and human studies. In a small human clinical trial to evaluate the safety and efficacy of fucoidan ingestion (brown seaweed extract), 3g daily of 75% w/w oral fucoidan for 12 days increased the proportion of CD34+CXCR4+ from 45 to 90% and the serum SDF-1 levels, which could be useful in CD34+ cells homing/mobilization via SDF-1/CXCR4 axis.

It has been associated with WHIM syndrome. WHIM like mutations in CXCR4 were recently identified in patients with Waldenström's macroglobulinemia, a B-cell malignancy. The presence of CXCR4 WHIM mutations has been associated with clinical resistance to ibrutinib in patients with Waldenström's macroglobulinemia.

While CXCR4's expression is low or absent in many healthy tissues, it was demonstrated to be expressed in over 23 types of cancer, including breast cancer, ovarian cancer, melanoma, and prostate cancer. Expression of this receptor in cancer cells has been linked to metastasis to tissues containing a high concentration of CXCL12, such as lungs, liver and bone marrow. However, in breast cancer where SDF1/CXCL12 is also expressed by the cancer cells themselves along with CXCR4, CXCL12 expression is positively correlated with disease free (metastasis free) survival. CXCL12 (over-)expressing cancers might not sense the CXCL12 gradient released from the metastasis target tissues since the receptor, CXCR4, is saturated with the ligand produced in an autocrine manner. Another explanation of this observation is provided by a study that shows the ability of CXCL12 (and CCL2) producing tumors to entrain neutrophils that inhibit seeding of tumor cells in the lung.

== Drug response ==
Chronic exposure to THC has been shown to increase T lymphocyte CXCR4 expression on both CD4+ and CD8+ T lymphocytes in rhesus macaques. It has been shown that BCR signalling inhibitors also affect CXCR4 pathway and thus CD20 expression.

== Interactions ==
CXCR4 has been shown to interact with USP14.

== See also ==
- CXCR4 antagonist
- HIV tropism
- Entry inhibitor
- Discovery and development of CCR5 receptor antagonists
