= HIV remission =

HIV functional cure without medication

HIV remission is a clinical state in which an individual diagnosed with human immunodeficiency virus (HIV) maintains plasma viral loads below the limit of detection without the ongoing administration of antiretroviral therapy (ART). In the context of HIV/AIDS research, remission is frequently distinguished from a "sterilizing cure," which requires the total elimination of the virus from all anatomical compartments. Instead, remission is often characterized as a "functional cure", wherein the host immune system or external interventions suppress viral replication and prevent disease progression in the absence of medication.

The primary barrier to achieving durable remission is the latent HIV reservoir. During the early stages of infection, the virus establishes a persistent pool of integrated proviral DNA within long-lived resting CD4+ T cells and other cellular reservoirs. While ART effectively arrests active replication, it has no impact on these dormant cells. Consequently, the cessation of treatment typically results in a viral rebound (the rapid re-emergence of detectable viremia) as the latent virus reactivates.

== Mechanisms and clinical pathways ==
Historically, instances of sustained HIV remission have emerged through three distinct pathways involving genetic resistance, intensive clinical intervention, or exceptional host immune responses.

=== Hematopoietic stem cell transplantation ===
The most robust examples of HIV remission have occurred in patients undergoing allogeneic hematopoietic stem cell transplantation (HSCT) to treat underlying hematologic malignancies. This pathway relies on two primary biological mechanisms:

- CCR5-Δ32 Mutation: Documentation of the "Berlin", "London (Adam Castillejo)", and "Düsseldorf" patients centers on the use of donors homozygous for the CCR5-Δ32 allele. This genetic mutation results in the phenotypic absence of the CCR5 co-receptor on the surface of CD4+ T cells, rendering the host's new immune system largely resistant to infection by R5-tropic HIV strains.
- Graft-versus-host effect: Evidence suggests that the replacement of the recipient's original immune system by donor-derived cells facilitates the depletion of the pre-existing viral reservoir through immunologic clearance.

=== Post-treatment control ===
Post-treatment controllers (PTCs) are individuals who initiate antiretroviral therapy (ART) during the acute phase of infection and subsequently maintain undetectable viral loads following a supervised analytical treatment interruption (ATI). Unlike patients who delay treatment, early-intervention individuals may preserve critical immune functions and limit the initial seeding and diversity of the latent reservoir. This reduction in the viral pool allows for secondary control mechanisms to stabilize viremia levels without ongoing medication.

=== Natural viral suppression ===
A small fraction of the HIV-positive population, estimated at less than 1%, exhibits the ability to control viral replication naturally. These individuals are categorized based on their clinical presentation:

- Elite Controllers: This group maintains undetectable viral loads for decades in the absence of ART. The phenotype is strongly associated with specific human leukocyte antigen (HLA) class I alleles, most notably HLA-B27 and HLA-B57. These alleles facilitate a highly efficient cytotoxic T lymphocyte (CTL) response capable of targeting conserved regions of the viral proteome, effectively suppressing replication through superior antigen presentation.

== See also ==
- Management of HIV/AIDS
- Undetectable = Untransmittable
- Timeline of HIV/AIDS
