= Paul Edmonds (patient) =

Oldest person in remission from HIV and leukemia

- Born: 1955 (age 70–71)
- Citizenship: American

Paul Edmonds is an American man recognized as the oldest individual to achieve remission from both HIV and leukemia. He is known as the "City of Hope Patient" from the hospital where he underwent treatment in Duarte, California. Diagnosed with HIV in 1988 at the age of 33, Edmonds spent over three decades living with the virus until 2018, when he faced a new challenge—a diagnosis of myelodysplastic syndrome, evolving into acute myelogenous leukemia. His journey to recovery, culminating in a stem cell transplant in 2019, at age 63, involved a donor with a rare genetic mutation (homozygous CCR5 Delta 32) resistant to most HIV strains. Edmonds ceased his HIV treatment in March 2021, with subsequent tests revealing no evidence of HIV in his body. Edmonds is among the five known individuals cured of HIV through stem cell transplantation for their blood cancer, alongside the Berlin Patient, London Patient, Düsseldorf Patient, and New York Patient.

== See also ==
- Timothy Ray Brown
- Adam Castillejo
- Stephen Crohn
- HIV/AIDS research
