= Nathalia Holt =

American microbiologist and writer (born 1980)

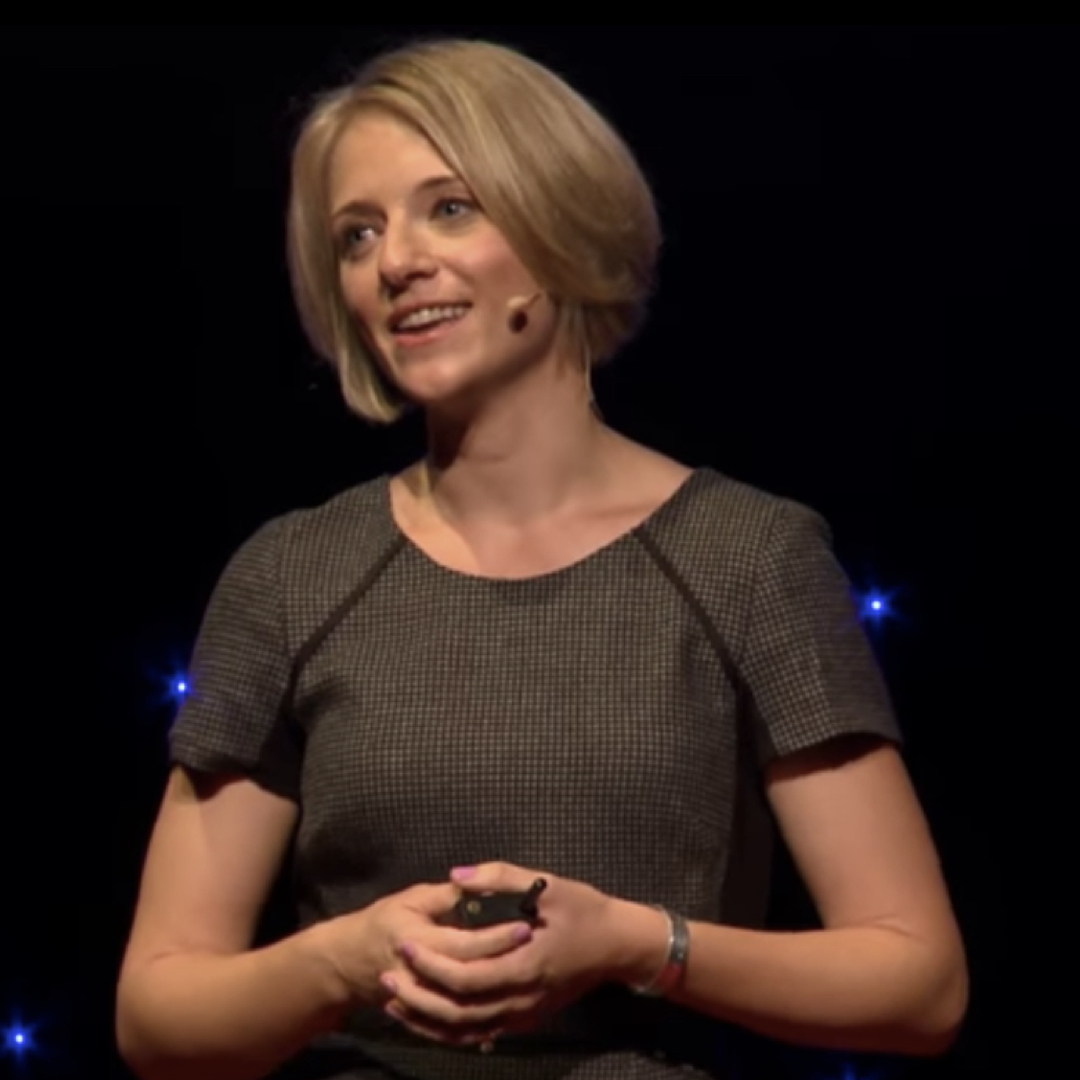
- Born: December 13, 1980 (age 45)
- Education: Harvard University, University of Southern California, Tulane University
- Occupation: Author
- Writing career
- Genre: Non-fiction
- Notable works: Rise of the Rocket Girls, The Queens of Animation, Cured

Nathalia Holt (born December 13, 1980) is a historian and an American author of non-fiction. Her works include Cured, Rise of the Rocket Girls, The Queens of Animation, Wise Gals and The Beast in the Clouds.

== Life ==
Holt is from New York, NY. She studied at University of Southern California, Tulane University, and Harvard University. Her career includes work at the Phillip T. and Susan M. Ragon Institute.

Her research as a science writer has included work at the JPL archives, the Caltech Library, and the Schlesinger Library on the History of Women in America at Harvard. Her work appears in The Atlantic, The New York Times, PBS, Popular Science, and NPR.

Holt is a journalist who documents the untold history of women. She has published three books in the field and spoken publicly on the history of women in science.

Holt's book Rise of the Rocket Girls: The Women Who Propelled Us, from Missiles to the Moon to Mars (2016) chronicles the lives of women computers at NASA's Jet Propulsion Laboratory (JPL) in California. It also puts them into the context of milestones in both scientific and more general history. Supervisors Macie Roberts and later Helen Ling, Barbara Paulson and Susan Finley employed women as computers at a time when few scientific careers were open to women.

Holt's book The Queens of Animation: The Untold Story of the Women who Transformed the World of Disney and Made Cinematic History (2019) tells the story of a group of female animators working at the Walt Disney Studios during the Golden age of animation. She chronicles the prejudice faced by the artists and the triumphs contributed to American film by Mary Blair, Retta Scott, and Gyo Fujikawa.

Holt's book Wise Gals: The Spies Who Built The CIA And Changed The Future of Espionage (2022) explores the unsung female spies of WWII who built the CIA She tells the stories of Eloise Page and Elizabeth Sudmeier who used espionage against Nazi Germany during World War II and the Soviet Union during the early Cold War. Holt writes of the Petticoat Panel that fought for institutional changes for women at the CIA.

Her book Cured: The People Who Defeated HIV (2015) discusses the scientific complexities of two patients who have been exceptions to the usual procession of AIDS. Each has experienced a "functional cure", raising hopes that researchers may someday find a "safe and reliable way" to protect patients against HIV. Two types of genetic mutation - the “exposed uninfected” and the “elite controllers,” - appear to be able to resist the disease. Holt describes the science involved, to the extent that it is currently understood.

Holt lives in Monterey, California.

== Works ==
- Cured: The People Who Defeated HIV. Penguin Publishing Group. February 24, 2015. ISBN 978-0-14-218184-3. OCLC 937872774
- Rise of the Rocket Girls: The Women Who Propelled Us, from Missiles to the Moon to Mars. Little, Brown. April 5, 2016. ISBN 978-0-316-33891-2. OCLC 969388193
- The Queens of Animation: The Untold Story of the Women Who Transformed the World of Disney and Made Cinematic History. Little, Brown. 2019. ISBN 978-0316439152.
- Wise Gals: The Spies Who Built the CIA and Changed the Future of Espionage. Penguin Random House. 2022. ISBN 9780593328484.
- The Beast in the Clouds. New York: Atria/One Signal Publishers. July 1, 2025. ISBN 978-1-6680-2774-5.

== See also ==
- Timothy Ray Brown
- Susan G. Finley
- Mary Blair
- Retta Scott
