= Janez Lawson =

American chemical engineer (1930–1990)

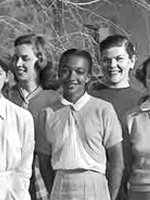
- Lawson in 1953
- Born: February 22, 1930
- Died: November 24, 1990 (aged 60)
- Education: University of California, Los Angeles
- Employer: Jet Propulsion Laboratory

Janez Yvonne Lawson Bordeaux (February 22, 1930 – November 24, 1990) was an American chemical engineer who became one of NASA's computers. She was the first African-American hired into a technical position at Jet Propulsion Laboratory. She programmed the IBM 701.

== Early life and education ==
Lawson was born on February 22, 1930, in Santa Monica, California. Her parents were Hilliard Lawson and Bernice Lawson. She attended Belmont High School and graduated in 1948. Lawson completed a bachelor's degree in chemical engineering at the University of California, Los Angeles in 1952. She was a straight-A student and President of the Delta Sigma Theta sorority.

== Career ==
Despite her qualifications, Lawson could not get work as a chemical engineer because of her race and gender. She saw an advertisement for a job as a computer in Pasadena. There was discussion about whether or not she should get the job, but Macie Roberts stood up for her. Lawson got the job, and in 1953 was one of the first Jet Propulsion Laboratory employees to be sent to a training course at IBM. Lawson was the first African-American hired into a technical position at Jet Propulsion Laboratory. She was promoted to mathematician in 1954. She became skilled at programming during the course, using a keypunch and learning speedcoding. Lawson lived in Los Angeles and would commute for over an hour to the Jet Propulsion Laboratory every day. Lawson joined the Ramo-Wooldridge Corporation in the late 1950s.
