= Ravi Gupta =

Clinical microbiologist

Professor Ravi Gupta FRCP FRCPath FRSB FMedSci
- Born: Ravindra Kumar Gupta; 20 September 1975 (age 50); Sunderland, England
- Education: Oxford University (BMBCh); Harvard School of Public Health (MPH); Cambridge University (MA); University College London (PhD)
- Scientific career
- Institutions: University of Cambridge; University College London

Ravindra Kumar Gupta (born 20 September 1975) is a professor of clinical microbiology at the Cambridge Institute of Therapeutic Immunology and Infectious Disease at the University of Cambridge. He is also a member of the faculty of the Africa Health Research Institute in Durban, South Africa.

Gupta was named in Time's 100 Most Influential People in 2020.

== Education ==
Gupta attended Brentwood School from 1987 to 1994. Gupta gained his undergraduate medical degree from Cambridge University in 1997 and then clinical degree from Oxford University in 2001, whilst completing a Master in Public Health at Harvard School of Public Health (1998-1999). He subsequently trained in infectious diseases in Oxford and The Hospital for Tropical Diseases (UCLH) and completed a PhD in Virology with Deenan Pillay and Greg Towers at UCL. He was elected to Fellowship of the Academy of Medical Sciences in 2021 and to Fellowship of the Royal Society of Biologists in 2022.

== Career ==
Gupta researches HIV, from basic science of how the virus interacts with human cells and the immune system to the emerging problem of drug resistant HIV. More recently he has worked on COVID-19 rapid diagnostics, SARS-CoV-2 intra host evolution, replication, cell tropism and entry, as well as evasion from B cell immunity.

Gupta was formerly Full Professor at University College London (2016-2019). He is head of the Gupta Lab and was supported by Wellcome Trust Fellowships from 2007 to 2023.

Gupta's HIV-1 work spans the UK and sub Saharan Africa. The lab focuses on four main areas:

- HIV drug resistance and implications for global scale up of antiretroviral therapy.
- Dissecting the biology of macrophage-virus interactions and the role of cell cycle given myeloid cells are parasitised by HIV and are a difficult-to-treat reservoir.
- SARS-CoV-2 evolutionary biology and chronic COVID-19 infection in immune suppressed individuals
- Immune responses to COVID-19 vaccination in risk groups

Gupta has worked in HIV drug resistance both at molecular and population levels, and his work showing exponential rises in transmitted HIV resistance in Africa through multi-country collaborations alongside WHO (Gupta et al, Lancet 2012, Gupta et al, Lancet Infectious Diseases 2018) led to change in WHO treatment guidelines for HIV, with recommendation for use of integrate inhibitors as first line core drugs. Gupta also reported the problem of tenofovir resistance in low-middle income settings and defined its emergence and characteristics through establishing the TenoRes collaboration with Bob Shafer at Stanford (Gregson et al, Lancet Infectious diseases 2016; Gregson et al, Lancet Infectious diseases 2017).

During his time working on HIV reservoirs, he discovered why macrophages are infected in vivo by revealing cell cycle transitions in macrophages that radically changed virus susceptibility via SAMHD1 and availability of dNTP for reverse transcription (Mlcochova et al, EMBO J 2016). In March 2019 it was reported that Gupta led a team demonstrating HIV remission in a HIV positive man with advanced Hodgkin's lymphoma following an 'unrelated' stem cell transplant, the so-called London Patient. After a bone marrow transplant from an HIV-resistant donor, the London Patient remained "cured" of his HIV. This is the second case of a patient cured of HIV (Gupta et al, Nature 2019, Gupta et al, Lancet HIV 2020). The first patient is referred to as the Berlin Patient.

Gupta's group reported the first evidence for immune escape and infectivity enhancement of SARS-CoV-2 within host, thus also defining the process by which new variants likely arise in immune compromised individuals (Kemp et al, Nature 2021). Follow up work defined the replication advantages of Alpha (Meng et al, Cell Reports 2021) and Delta variants with efficient ability to fuse cells (Mlcochova et al, Nature 2021), and the tropism shift and immune escape of Omicron (Meng et al, Nature 2022). These observations have translated to the clinic, reflecting disease severity of Delta versus Omicron and critically aiding public health policy regarding newly emerging variants at global scale. His work on COVID-19 vaccine induced immunity in older and immune suppressed persons has also been internationally recognised.
