= Long-term nonprogressor =

HIV-infected individual who does not progress to immune deficiency

Long-term nonprogressors (LTNPs) are individuals infected with HIV, who maintain a CD4 cell count greater than 500, without antiretroviral therapy with a detectable viral load. Many of these patients have been HIV positive for 30 years without progressing to the point of needing to take medication in order not to develop AIDS. They have been the subject of a great deal of research, since an understanding of their ability to control HIV infection may lead to the development of immune therapies or a therapeutic vaccine. The classification "Long-term non-progressor" is not permanent, because some patients in this category have gone on to develop AIDS.

Long-term nonprogressors typically have viral loads under 10,000 copies/mL blood, do not take antiretrovirals, and have CD4+ counts within the normal range. Most people with HIV not on medication have viral loads which are much higher.

It is estimated that around 1 in 500 people with HIV are long-term nonprogressors. Without the symptoms of AIDS, many LTNP patients may not know they are infected.

Genetic traits that confer greater resistance or more robust immune response to HIV are thought to explain why LTNP patients are able to live much longer with HIV than patients who are not LTNP. Some LTNP are infected with a weakened or inactive form of HIV, but it is now known that many LTNP patients carry a fully virulent form of the virus. Genetic traits that may affect progression include:

- Gene mutation: A mutation in the FUT2 gene affects the progression of HIV-1 infection. 20% of Europeans who have that mutation are called "non secretor" because of their absence of a certain type of antigen that also provides strong resistance against norovirus.
- Mitochondrial DNA: Different mitochondrial DNA haplotypes in humans may increase or decrease rates of AIDS progression. Haplotypes associated with more loosely coupled mitochondrial respiration, with reduced ATP and ROS generation, have been associated with faster progression and vice versa.
- Receptor mutations: A low percentage of long-term nonprogressors have been shown to have inherited mutations of the CCR5 receptor of T cell lymphocytes. HIV uses CCR5 to enter these cells. It is believed that the Δ32 (delta 32) variant of CCR5 impairs HIV ability to infect cells and cause disease. An understanding of this mechanism led to the development of a class of HIV medicines, the entry inhibitors. The presence of this mutation, however, is not a unifying theme among LTNPs and is observed in an exceedingly small number of these patients.
- HLA type has also been correlated with long-term non-progressor cohorts. In particular, strong correlations have been found between possessing the HLA Class 1 HLA-B*5701, HLA-B*5703, and/or HLA-B*2705 alleles and ability to exert control over HIV.
- TCR repertoire HIV controllers exhibit a highly skewed T-cell receptor repertoire dominated by specific TRAV24 and TRBV2 variable genes, with shared CDR3 motifs and public clonotypes that possess high affinity for HIV antigens. These TCRs, capable of cross-restriction across multiple HLA-DR alleles, can confer enhanced antigen sensitivity and polyfunctionality when transferred to healthy T cells, suggesting their potential role in immunotherapeutic strategies for HIV.
- Antibody production: All individuals with HIV make antibodies against the virus. In most patients, broadly neutralizing antibodies do not emerge until approximately 2–4 years after the initial infection. At this point, the latent reservoir has already been established and the presence of broadly neutralizing antibodies is not enough to prevent disease progression. In some rare patients, these antibodies emerge earlier and can result in a delayed disease course. These patients, however, are not typically classified as LTNPs, but rather as slow progressors, who will eventually develop AIDS. Induction of broadly neutralizing antibodies in healthy individuals is a potential strategy for a preventive HIV vaccine, as is the elicitation of these antibodies through rationally designed immunogens. Direct production of these antibodies in somatic tissue through plasmid transfection also poses a viable method for making these antibodies endogenously.
- APOBEC3G protein production: In a small number of people infected with HIV, the virus is naturally suppressed without medical treatment. These people may carry high quantities of a protein called APOBEC3G that disrupts viral replication in cells. APOBEC3G, or "A3" for short, is a protein that sabotages reverse transcription, the process HIV relies on for its replication. This process involves the virus transcribing its single-stranded RNA genome into double-stranded DNA that is incorporated into the cell's genome. A3 usually stops dormant viruses in the human genome, called endogenous retroviruses, from reawakening and causing infections.

The term 'long-term nonprogressors' is used for HIV carriers only but the wide term asymptomatic carrier is well known for many other infections.

== Clearance of the virus ==
Recently, there have been reports of elite controllers who maintain undetectable viral loads. In 2019, an American named Loreen Willenberg was announced as the first such case. In 2021, an Argentinian dubbed "the Esperanza patient" after the town in which she lived was also identified. Willemberg had received antiretroviral therapy but stopped treatment at some point. The Argentinian patient took antiretroviral therapy only while pregnant, but her viral load was nevertheless reported to be undetectable years after treatment discontinuation. This could inform the development of a "sterilising cure."

== See also ==
- Innate resistance to HIV
- HIV/AIDS research
- Stephen Crohn
- Timothy Ray Brown (The Berlin patient)
- Adam Castillejo (the London patient)
- HIV-positive people
