= Barbara Paulson =

American human computer at NASA (1928–2023)

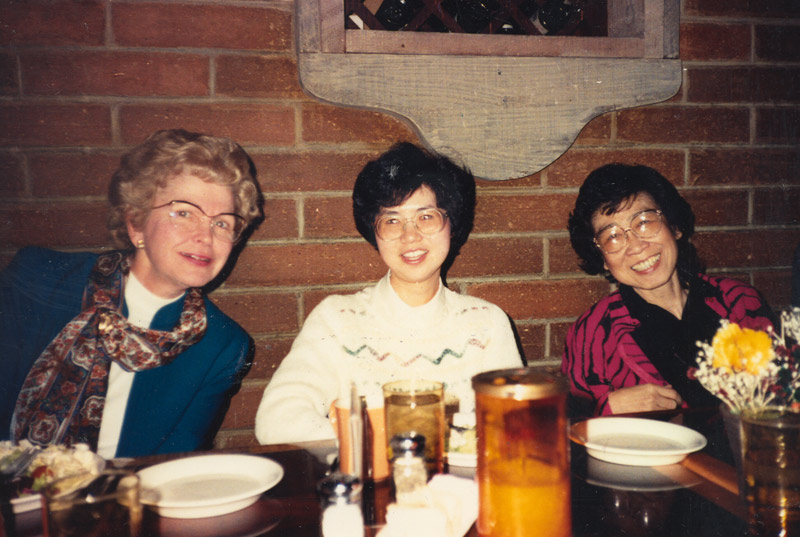
- (left to right) Paulson, Vickie Wang and Helen Ling, working at the Jet Propulsion Laboratory, socializing over lunch (1980)
- Born: Barbara Jean Lewis; April 11, 1928; Columbus, Ohio, U.S.
- Died: February 26, 2023 (aged 94); Des Moines, Iowa, U.S.
- Occupations: JPL Human Computer, Engineer
- Employer: Jet Propulsion Laboratory
- Notable work: Trajectory calculations for Explorer 1, Vikings 1 & 2, Voyagers 1 & 2, Mariner Probes
- Spouse: Harry Murray Paulson (1959-2003)
- Children: Karen Bishop, Kathleen Knutson

Barbara Jean Paulson (née Lewis; April 11, 1928 – February 26, 2023) was an American human computer at NASA's Jet Propulsion Laboratory (JPL) and one of the first female scientists employed there. Paulson began working as a mathematician at JPL in 1948, where she calculated rocket trajectories by hand. She is among the women who made early progress at JPL.

== Early life ==
Barbara Jean Lewis was born in Columbus, Ohio on April 11, 1928. She was raised with three siblings (two older sisters and one younger brother), and when she was 12 years old her father died. Beginning in 9th grade, Paulson took four years of Latin and math while her sisters took short hand as Paulson did not want to be a secretary. After attending Ohio State University for one year, Paulson's sister, who was already working in Pasadena at the time, convinced her mother to move to Pasadena as well. In 1947 the family moved to Pasadena, California, where her career at JPL would begin.

In 1959, Barbara married Harry Murray Paulson in Pasadena, where they lived until 1962 before moving to Monrovia. In 1975, they finally settled in Glendora.

== Career ==
Paulson joined the Jet Propulsion Laboratory in 1948 as a computer, calculating rocket paths and working on the MGM-5 Corporal, the first guided missile designed by the United States to carry a nuclear warhead. Paulson and her colleagues were at one point invited to sign their names on the 100th Corporal rocket prior to its transport to the White Sands test range. The rocket exploded shortly after liftoff. On January 31, 1958, Paulson was assigned to the operations center for Explorer-1, the first satellite of the United States, launched during the Space Race with the Soviet Union. Paulson did the work with minimal equipment: a mechanical pencil, light table, and graph paper. The multi-stage launch that Paulson aided in calculations for allowed the Corporal to carry a warhead over 200 miles.

In 1960, when Paulson was 32 years old, she and her husband Harry were expecting their first child. When Paulson requested a closer parking space at work because she was pregnant, she was forced to quit as JPL did not employ pregnant women at the time and keeping a pregnant woman on staff would result in insurance policy problems. JPL had no maternity leave, so women who were fired or forced to quit their positions did not have jobs to return to after giving birth. Paulson's supervisor, Helen Ling, worked hard to rehire women who had been forced out with no parental leave, so in 1961, when her daughter was seven months old, Paulson accepted Ling's offer and returned to the lab. Paulson notably did not apply for a better parking spot when she got pregnant for the second time. From 1953 to 1970 at JPL a beauty contest was held among female employees. One year, Paulson came in third place. During the 1950s the queen of the contest was called 'Miss Guided Missile' and in the 1960s 'the Queen of Outer Space'.

In the 1960s, with JPL's reputation cemented by the success of Explorer-1, JPL began to set its sights on the moon and other interplanetary exploration missions. Paulson and her colleague Helen Ling worked overtime to calculate the trajectories of the Mariner probes that would later be sent to Venus and Mars. Paulson and her colleagues determined that only brief timeframes and launch windows existed that allowed for the ideal Hohman transfer orbit from Earth to its target. In the late 1960s, Paulson was given the title of engineer and eventually became a supervisor in the lab.

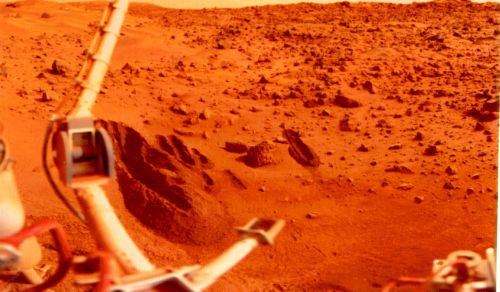
Paulson's calculations helped ensure success of Viking 1 which sent the first images from the surface of Mars (1976)

In the 1970s, Paulson later went on to play a vital role in the Viking program, becoming the first lander to reach the surface of Mars. Paulson successfully calculated the trajectory the Viking probe needed on its 11-month transit between Earth and Mars. Paulson's calculations also proved to be essential during the entry, descent, and landing (EDL) phase of the mission, in which the lander would detach from the spacecraft, enter the martian atmosphere, and parachute down to the surface. In the late 1970s, Paulson and her colleagues worked on some of the first interstellar trajectories during the planning of the Voyager missions, in which Voyager 1, having launched in September 1977, and as of April 13, 2019, is the most distant from Earth of all human-made objects.

Paulson retired from JPL in 1993 and remained in Pasadena until 2003 before moving to Iowa.

== Personal life ==
Paulson and her husband Harry had daughters Karen (née Paulson) Bishop and Kathleen (née Paulson) Knutson, four grandchildren (Jonathan, Kyle, Harrison, and Corrine), and several nieces and nephews. Throughout pregnancy and her eventual return to work at JPL, Barbara's husband at the time was a real estate appraiser and member of the Pasadena Board of Realtors. Fortunately, upon Barbara's return to work, Harry was able to adjust his schedule, as did many of the other human computers with children, to ensure that their children were taken care of.

Barbara Paulson's husband, Harry Murray Paulson, died on July 9, 2003. They were married for 44 years. In 2003, Paulson sold her home following her husband's death and moved to Iowa to be closer to her daughters and their families.

Barbara Paulson died in Des Moines, Iowa, on February 26, 2023, at the age of 94.

== Recognition and legacy ==
In 1959 Paulson was recognized and received her 10-year pin for her work at the Jet Propulsion Laboratory. Paulson would work at the Jet Propulsion Laboratory for 45 years, and retire in 1993. In 2016, Nathalia Holt wrote Rise of the Rocket Girls, a book about Paulson and other women who were early employees at NASA.
