= Provirus silencing =

Provirus silencing, or proviral silencing, is the repression of expression of proviral genes in cells. A provirus is a viral DNA that has been incorporated into the chromosome of a host cell, often by retroviruses such as HIV. Endogenous retroviruses are always in the provirus state in the host cell and replicate through reverse transcription. By integrating their genome into the host cell genome, they make use of the host cell's transcription and translation mechanisms to achieve their own propagation. This often leads to harmful impact on the host. However, in recent gene therapy techniques, retroviruses are often used to deliver desired genes instead of their own viral genome into the host genome. As such, researchers are interested in the host cell's mechanisms to silence such gene expressions to find out firstly, how the host cell manages provirus transcription to eliminate the deleterious effects of retroviruses; and secondly, how can researchers ensure stable and long-term expression of retrovirus-mediated gene transfer.

== Mechanisms and Pathways ==
It has been found that the level transcription of integrated retroviruses depends on both genetic and chromatin remodeling at the site of integration. Mechanisms such as DNA methylation and histone modification seem to play important roles in the suppression provirus transcription, such that proviral activity can be silenced. The location of integration also plays a crucial role with the level of silencing that is observed. For example, integration into the H3K4me3 regions, areas of the genome that are twisted around histone H3 proteins that are tri-methylated at the 4th lysine residue. It has been reported that the manipulation or insertion of CpG dinucleotide islands can lead to the disruption of proviral silencing. Silencing frequently begins with the binding of a zinc finger DNA-binding protein to the primer sequence, targeting more the expression of the provirus itself rather than attempting to curtail the sequence. The protein then proceeds to recruit other enzymes that complete the silencing through DNA or histone methylation. However, studies within the field do note that the patterns are species-specific with regards to the virus in question, thus caution should be taken when attempting to generalize to all cases. Additionally, many studies focus on proviral silencing within murine embryonic cells as opposed to human cells. Some researchers also posit that proviral silencing may be more complex than a simple question of whether the virus is repressed or not. They suggest that proviruses played more of a role with transcriptional regulation as they integrated and evolved with the host sequence over time, occasionally serving as promoters or enhancers.

== Challenges with Effective Silencing ==
It has been shown that the orientation of proviruses can have dramatic effects on the expression of proviruses. With regard to HIV-1, the viral genome is frequently inserted into the introns of active genes. Perhaps unsurprisingly, when the viral genome is oriented in the same direction as the host gene, expression is increased. The converse is also true, with genes that are oriented in the opposite direction of the gene showing reduced expression. This produces challenges for effective therapeutics to aid in treatment for the disease because it can lead to large variations in detectability. This can lead to struggles for physicians who are attempting to maintain HIV latency. HIV reservoirs, or cells that are infected with HIV but not actively producing viral particles, additionally contribute to this problem. CD4+ T cells are considered to be the main reservoir and are reported to have a half-life of over three years. While the cells are effectively temporarily silencing the expression of HIV, this results in the condition being essentially impossible to eradicate.

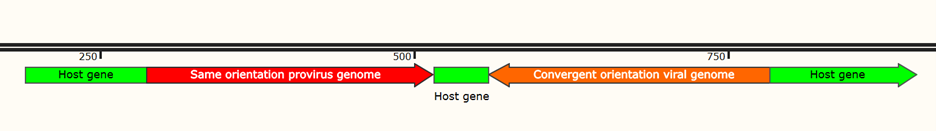
This diagram provides a visual representation of provirus integration in the same or convergent orientation to the host gene. Generated using SnapGene® software (from Dotmatics; available at snapgene.com).

Additionally, DNA methylation has been linked to aging and geriatric disease. Increases in DNA methylation have been linked to diseases including various types of cancer, Alzheimer's disease, Type 2 Diabetes, and cardiovascular disease. From a proviral silencing standpoint, this does make logical sense as individuals would naturally accumulate more proviruses over their lifetimes. This does pose a slight concern because as groups have researched the utility of DNA methylation clocks to predict age, there is the risk that treatments which treat DNA methylation with the goal of reducing biological age inadvertently result in the increase of proviral expression within their patients. Additionally, it must be emphasized that most of the work in this field is correlational rather than causational.

== Managing Proviral Silencing in a Gene Therapy Context ==
The expression of transgenes is often hindered by mechanisms associated with proviral silencing. This naturally proves to be an issue when attempting to create longer-lasting gene therapies or transgenic cell lines. Most methods center around choosing a specific locus of integration.

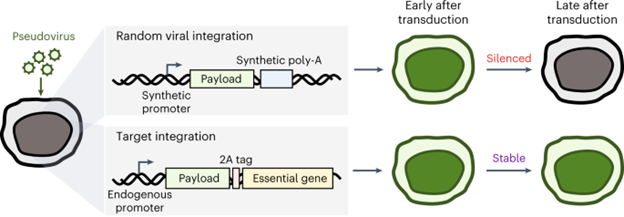
Schematic depicting the targeted integration of the payload between the essential gene and endogenous promoter for stable expression.

Recently, researchers have demonstrated that targeted integration of a lentiviral payload using homology-directed repair can result in stable integration and expression. In this approach, CRISPR-associated ribonucleoprotein complexes (CRISPR RNP complexes) are used to create double-stranded breaks upstream of an endogenously promoted essential gene. The payload is designed to where it contains the transgene flanked by two regions of DNA that are homologous/identical to the regions upstream of the gene, enabling it to integrate in the same reading frame as the gene. This approach is similar to other strategies that seek to integrate in areas that are less susceptible to silencing through more mechanistic methods.
