= Berlin Patient =

German patients cured of HIV

The Berlin patient is an anonymous person from Berlin, Germany, who was described in 1998 as exhibiting prolonged "post-treatment control" of HIV viral load after HIV treatments were interrupted.

The phrase "Berlin patient" was later used to preserve the anonymity of a different individual claimed to have been functionally cured of HIV infection, when his case was presented at the 2008 Conference on Retroviruses and Opportunistic Infections, where his cure was first announced, and because he resided and was treated in Berlin. This second "Berlin patient" chose to come forward and make his name, Timothy Ray Brown, public in late 2010.

Eleven years later, nearly on the same date, at the same conference, it was announced that it appeared that a third man had been cured; he was called the "London Patient". The patient described made himself and his name, Adam Castillejo, public in March 2020. He also received a bone marrow transplant to treat a cancer (Hodgkin's lymphoma) but was given weaker immunosuppressive drugs. The selected donor also carried the CCR5-Δ32 mutation.

== Cases ==
The first Berlin patient was described in 1998. After receiving an experimental therapy, the patient, who has remained anonymous, has maintained low levels of HIV and has remained off antiretroviral therapy.

The world-renowned "second" Berlin patient, Timothy Ray Brown, had a bone marrow transplant on February 7, 2007, to cure his leukemia, and hopefully his HIV. The results of the procedure were presented by Dr. Gero Hütter at the CROI 2008 Conference in Boston. He received a stem cell transplant from a donor naturally immune to HIV and has remained off antiretroviral therapy since the first day of his stem cell transplant.

Their stories were chronicled in the 2014 book, Cured: The People who Defeated HIV (2015) by Nathalia Holt. The Visconti Cohort, a group of fourteen patients who received early therapy for the virus (described in a scientific paper published in 2013), were considered to be in "long-term virological remission," meaning that they still harbor the virus within their bodies but HIV viral loads are low or undetectable despite being off antiretroviral therapy. At least two Visconti cohort members have since restarted antiretroviral therapy; in one case due to increasing viral load and CD4 T cell count decline, and in another case due to a cancer diagnosis. Another cohort member is displaying clear evidence of declining CD4 T cell counts over time. This information was revealed in the last two slides of a presentation given by Asier Sáez-Cirión at the International AIDS Society's Towards an HIV Cure Symposium in 2015. Timothy Ray Brown is the only individual who is considered to have a sterilizing cure, meaning there is strong evidence that he no longer harbors infectious HIV virus within his body.

== Anonymous: the 1998 Berlin patient ==
Anonymous
- Born: Germany

The first Berlin patient was a German man in his mid-twenties. He was a patient of Dr. Heiko Jessen in Berlin, Germany. He was diagnosed with acute HIV infection in 1995. He was prescribed an unusual combination therapy: didanosine, indinavir and hydroxyurea. Hydroxyurea was the most unusual of the three, as it is a cancer drug not approved by the U.S. Food and Drug Administration (FDA) for HIV treatment. The combination was part of a small trial Dr. Jessen was testing in patients during acute HIV infection. After several treatment interruptions, the patient went off the prescribed therapy completely. The virus became almost undetectable. The patient has remained off antiretroviral therapy. In 2014 a follow-up report in the New England Journal of Medicine (NEJM) concludes "a likely explanation for control of viral replication in this patient is genetic background, regardless of intervention," although this point is still under debate. The NEJM update reports that the individual possesses the HLA-B*57 allele, which has been associated with HIV control, and a large proportion of CD8 T cell responses targeting HIV are restricted by HLA-B*57.

== Timothy Ray Brown: the 2008 cured Berlin patient ==
Timothy Ray Brown
- Born: 1966; United States
- Died: 30 September 2020 (aged 53–54)

The most famous Berlin patient is Timothy Ray Brown. He was originally from Seattle, Washington. He was diagnosed with HIV in 1995 and began antiretroviral therapy. In 2006, Brown was diagnosed with acute myeloid leukemia (AML). His physician, Dr. Gero Hütter, at Charité Hospital in Berlin, arranged for him to receive a hematopoietic stem cell transplant from a donor with the "delta32" mutation on the CCR5 receptor. This mutation, found at relatively high frequencies in Northern Europeans (~16% heterozygous, ~1% homozygous), results in a mutated CCR5 protein. The majority of HIV cannot enter a human cell without a functional CCR5 gene. An exception to this is a small minority of viruses that use alternate receptors, such as CXCR4 or CCR2. Those individuals who are homozygous for the CCR5 mutation are resistant to HIV and rarely progress to AIDS. Brown received two stem cell transplants from one donor homozygous for the delta32 mutation: one in 2007 and one in 2008. Brown stopped taking his antiretroviral medication on the day of his first transplant. Three months after the first stem cell transplant, levels of HIV rapidly plummeted to undetectable levels while his CD4 T cell count increased. In addition, blood and tissue samples from areas of the body where HIV is known to hide were tested. The results were published in the New England Journal of Medicine. As of 2011, Brown remained off antiretroviral therapy and was considered cured, although some debate exists whether there was no trace of the virus in his body (a "sterilizing" cure) or whether he simply no longer needed treatment (a "functional" cure).

Timothy Ray Brown died on September 30, 2020, after a five-month battle with leukaemia.

== See also ==
- Mississippi baby
- Lulu and Nana controversy
- Ravindra Gupta, doctor who treated the London Patient
