= History of the Deep Space Network =

Deep Space Network
- Organization: Interplanetary Network Directorate
- Location: California, Pacific States Region
- Coordinates: 34°12′3″N 118°10′18″W
- Website: Deepspace Network website

Telescopes
- Goldstone Deep Space Communications Complex: near Barstow, California, USA
- Robledo de Chavela: near Madrid, Spain
- Canberra Deep Space Communications Complex: near Canberra, Australia

The forerunner of the Deep Space Network was established in January 1958, when JPL, then under contract to the U.S. Army, deployed portable radio tracking stations in Nigeria, Singapore, and California to receive telemetry and plot the orbit of the Army-launched Explorer 1, the first successful U.S. satellite.

NASA (and the DSN by extension) was officially established on October 1, 1958, to consolidate the separately developing space-exploration programs of the U.S. Army, U.S. Navy, and U.S. Air Force into one civilian organization.

== Origin in the 1950s ==
On December 3, 1958, JPL was transferred from the US Army to NASA and given responsibility for the design and execution of lunar and planetary exploration programs using remotely controlled spacecraft.

Shortly after the transfer NASA established the concept of the Deep Space Instrumentation Facility (DSIF) as a separately managed and operated communications system that would accommodate all deep space missions, thereby avoiding the need for each flight project to acquire and operate its own specialized space communications network.

The coded doppler, ranging, and command (CODORAC) system developed by Eberhardt Rechtin, Richard Jaffe, and Walt Victor became the basis for much of the DSIF's electronics. Susan Finley was part of the team that built the network's software.

In order to support deep space missions around the clock it was necessary to establish a network of three stations separated by approximately 120 degrees of longitude so that as the Earth turned a spacecraft was always above the horizon of at least one station. To this end two overseas facilities with 26m antennas were established to complement the 26m antenna sites (DSIF 11 and 12) at Goldstone in California. (DSIF 13 at Goldstone was used for research and development.) The first overseas site was DSIF 41 at Island Lagoon near Woomera in Australia. It was operated by the Australian Department of Supply which ran the Woomera Rocket Range. The other, DSIF 51, was at Hartebeesthoek near Johannesburg in South Africa, operated by the South African Council for Scientific and Industrial Research (CSIR). These two stations were completed in 1961. Each DSIF station had transmit and receive capability at 960 MHz in the L-band of the radio spectrum, and could process telemetry. Telephone and teletype circuits linked the stations to a mission operations room at JPL. As missions became more numerous the operations room developed into the Space Flight Operations Facility (which was designated a national historic landmark in 1985), and the personnel and equipment common to all missions were incorporated into the DSIF which was renamed the Deep Space Network in 1963.

The DSN was given responsibility for its own research, development, and operation in support of all of its users. Under this concept, it has contributed to the development of low-noise receivers; large parabolic-dish antennas; tracking, telemetry, and command systems; digital signal processing; and deep space navigation.

== The Mariner Era 1961 to 1974 ==
The DSN started the period able to support JPL designed spacecraft and telemetry and was progressively improved to cope with the increased demands placed upon it by new programs.

Missions supported in the Mariner era
Program name	Mission type	Number of launches	Number of missions	First launch	Last launch
Ranger	Lunar photo	9	3	Aug 1961	Mar 1965
Mariner	Venus or Mars flyby Mars orbiter Venus flyby, Mercury orbiter	7; 2; 1	5; 1; 1	Jul 1962; May 1971; Nov 1973	Mar 1969; May 1971; Nov 1973
Pioneer	Interplanetary; Jupiter flyby	4; 2	4; 2	Dec 1965; Mar 1972	Nov 1968; Apr 1973
Surveyor	Lunar lander	7	5	May 1966	Jan 1968
Lunar Orbiter	Lunar photo	5	5	Aug 1966	Aug 1967
Apollo	Piloted Lunar	16	7 Test; 6 Landers	Nov 1967	Dec 1972

In 1963 the availability of new amplifiers and transmitters operating in the S-band (at 2,200 MHz) allowed the DSN to take advantage of better tracking performance at the higher frequency, and later missions were designed to use it. However the Ranger and early Mariner missions still needed L-band, so converters were installed at the stations along with the new S-band upgrades. These converters were removed at the end of the L-band missions. This transfer to S-band was a major enhancement of the DSN capabilities in this era; another was the introduction of rubidium frequency standards which improved the quality of radio Doppler data and hence improved the trajectory determinations needed for interplanetary missions.

As the supported and planned missions became more numerous it became clear that a second network of stations was required. For political and logistical reasons the new overseas stations were established at Robledo near Madrid in Spain, and at Tidbinbilla near Canberra in Australia, and the second network of 26m antennas was operational in 1965.

JPL had long recognized the need for larger antennas to support missions to distant planets and a 64 m antenna of a radical new design was built at Goldstone. It gave over six times the sensitivity of the 26 m antennas, more than doubling their tracking range. The station was commissioned in 1966 as DSS 14.

Mobile DSN equipment was used at Cape Canaveral to check out spacecraft compatibility and operation prior to launch, and monitor the early flight. In 1965 this became a permanent facility, DSS 71.

The early Surveyor missions were planned to launch with a direct-ascent trajectory to the Moon, rather than insertion from a parking orbit. Translunar injection would then be before spacecraft rise at DSS 51 or 61. To obtain the early trajectory data vital for mid-course corrections, a new station with a small and fast-moving antenna was built on Ascension Island and became DSS 72. The station was integrated with the Apollo program.

=== 1966 to 1968 ===
Deep Space Network in 1966
Location	DSS Name	DSS No	Antenna diameter	Type of mount	Initial operation
Goldstone, California	Pioneer; Echo; Venus; Mars	11; 12; 13; 14	26 m 26 m 26 m 64 m	Polar; Polar; Az-El; Az-El	1958; 1962; 1962; 1966
Woomera, Australia; Canberra Australia	Island Lagoon; Tidbinbilla	41; 42	26 m 26 m	Polar; Polar	1961; 1965
Johannesburg, South Africa; Madrid Spain	Hartebeesthoek; Robledo	51; 61	26 m 26 m	Polar; Polar	1961; 1965
Launch support Cape Canaveral; Ascension Island	Spacecraft Monitor; Devil's Ashpit	71; 72	1.2 m 9 m	Az-El; Az-El	1965; 1966

In the 1966 to 1968 period the NASA lunar program of Surveyor, Lunar Orbiter and Apollo backup support almost fully utilized the DSN. The Pioneer, Surveyor and Lunar Orbiter programs all supplied mission-dependent equipment at the tracking stations for command and telemetry processing purposes and this could be quite large. For example, the Lunar Orbiter equipment at DSS 41 required the building of an extension to the control room, a photographic processing area and darkroom, and water de-mineralising equipment. Station personnel maintained and operated the Pioneer equipment, but the considerably more involved Surveyor and Lunar Orbiter equipment was operated by mission personnel, at least on the early missions.

One network of three stations was equipped for Surveyor, and another network dedicated to Lunar Orbiter. Support was also needed for the Mariner 5 Venus mission, and for Pioneer 6-9 interplanetary spacecraft which kept operating long after their expected lifetimes. Mariner 4 was also picked up again. DSS 14, the new 64m antenna, was called on to support nearly all of these missions but not always as a prime site.

To simplify the problems of accommodating special command and telemetry equipment and personnel at stations, the DSN developed a "multi-mission" approach. A generic set of equipment would be provided that future missions would all use, and a start was made by introducing computers at the stations to decode telemetry. Mission dependent equipment could be replaced by separate computer programs for each mission. Another significant improvement at this time was the introduction of ranging systems that used a coded signal transmitted to and returned from the spacecraft. The time of travel was used to measure the range more accurately and to greater distances, and this improved trajectory determination and navigation. The station clocks were kept in synchronism to 5 microseconds using the "Moon Bounce" system. The Goldstone Venus station transmitted a coded X-band timing signal to each overseas station during mutual lunar viewing periods. The signal was tailored on each occasion to allow for the propagation time to the station via the Moon.

=== 1969 to 1974 ===
In 1969 the Mariner 6 and Mariner 7 spacecraft to Mars were in the same part of the sky and both in view of a DSN site at the same time, though not within the beamwidth of a single antenna. Tracking both simultaneously required two antennas and two telemetry data processors, one for each downlink. At the same time the interplanetary Pioneer spacecraft were tracked and backup support for Apollo was required. The DSN was again hard pressed to service all its customers. As Mars began to draw near towards the end of July, encounter operations began with Mariner 7 only five days behind Mariner 6. Corliss describes what happened next.

All seemed to be going well until about six hours before the Mariner 6 encounter, when Johannesburg reported that the signal from Mariner 7 had disappeared. It was an emergency that came at the worst possible time. The Robledo, Spain antenna discontinued its tracking of Pioneer 8 and began to search for the lost spacecraft. When Mars came into view for Goldstone, the Pioneer 26m antenna joined the search, while the Echo 26m antenna continued tracking Mariner 6. It was decided to send a command to Mariner 7 to switch from the highly directional high-gain antenna to its omnidirectional low-gain antenna. The spacecraft responded correctly, and suddenly both the Pioneer station and the Tidbinbilla station began receiving low-rate telemetry from the recovered spacecraft. Something had happened to the spacecrafi but no one knew just what.

Mudgway continues:

While the DSN was committed to support one Mariner at a time in a mission-critical phase, this situation presented one spacecraft approaching encounter and a second one with a serious and unknown problem. To deal with it, the DSN applied its main effort to the ongoing Mariner 6 encounter, while a special team at JPL studied the Mariner 7 anomaly.

Fortunately, the Mariner 6 encounter events executed without any problems. Many pictures of Mars were taken and successfully returned to Earth using both the high-rate and normal low-rate telemetry systems. The special "Tiger Team" at JPL was able to overcome the Mariner 7 attitude problem by using the real-time high-rate telemetry sight, the TV cameras on Mars, in time to carry out a very successful encounter.

For both encounters, the new High-Rate Telemetry System (HRT) proved its worth, not only in recovering from the Mariner 7 emergency, but also in providing a much faster channel for playing back TV and other high-rate science from Mars to Earth.

Mariner 9, launched in 1971, was a Mars orbiter mission, a good deal more complicated than previous flyby missions and requiring precise navigation and high data rates. Since the last Mariner mission the Multi-Mission Telemetry System and the High-Rate Telemetry System (HRT) were fully operational. But the high speed data could only be sent when the 64m antenna at Goldstone was tracking.

At this time there was a substantial expansion of the number of antennas. An additional 26 m antenna and a 64 m antenna was built at each of Tidbinbilla and Robledo to support Apollo and Mariner 10 and the planned Viking missions. As part of a consolidation of stations into central locations, the Woomera station (DSS 41) was decommissioned in 1972. The antenna and basic receiving and power house equipment was offered to the Australian government, and although used by Australian scientists for groundbreaking VLBI measurements, it was eventually dismantled and scrapped due to logistical problems and the prohibitive cost of transporting it to a new location. DSS 51 in South Africa was similarly decommissioned in 1974, but in this case was taken over by the South African Council for Scientific and Industrial Research (CSIR) and recommissioned as a radio astronomy facility, which is now Hartebeesthoek Radio Astronomy Observatory.

Deep Space Network in 1974
Location	DSS name	DSS No	Antenna diameter	Type of mount	Initial operation
Goldstone California	Pioneer; Echo; Venus; Mars	11; 12; 13; 14	26m 26m 26m 64m	Polar; Polar; Az-El; Az-El	1958; 1962; 1962; 1966
Tidbinbilla Australia	Weemala; Ballima; Honeysuckle Creek	42; 43; 44	26m 64m 26m	Polar; Az-El; X-Y	1965; 1973; 1973
Madrid Spain	Robledo; Cebreros; Robledo	61; 62; 63	26m 26m 64m	Polar; Polar; Az-El	1965; 1967; 1973

Mariner 10 incorporated a Venus flyby followed by an orbiter round Mercury, and required the network of 64 m antennas and special DSN enhancements including use of a developmental supercooled maser at DSS 43, installation of an S/X-band dichroic reflector plate and feed cones at DSS 14 and enhanced data transmission circuits from the DSN stations to JPL. The second encounter with Mercury in 1974 was at a greater distance and the technique of "arraying" antennas, which had been demonstrated by Spanish engineers at the Madrid complex, was used at Goldstone. The Pioneer 10 mission with a 60-day encounter with Jupiter competed for time on the 26 m and 64 m antennas with the Mariner 10 mission and the need for Goldstone 64 m radar surveillance of possible Viking lander sites. Allocation of the DSN resources became even more difficult.

=== The Apollo program ===
To support the Apollo crewed lunar-landing program NASA's Manned Space Flight Network (MSFN) installed extra 26 m antennas at Goldstone; Honeysuckle Creek, Australia; and Fresnedillas, Spain. However, during lunar operations spacecraft in two different locations needed to be tracked. Rather than duplicate the MSFN facilities for these few days of use, in this case the DSN tracked one while the MSFN tracked the other. The DSN designed the MSFN stations for lunar communication and provided a second antenna at each MSFN site (the MSFN sites were near the DSN sites for just this reason).

This arrangement also provided redundancy and help in the case of emergencies. Almost all spacecraft are designed so normal operation can be conducted on the smaller (and more economical) antennas of the DSN (or MSFN). However, during an emergency the use of the largest antennas is crucial. This is because a troubled spacecraft may be forced to use less than its normal transmitter power, attitude control problems may preclude the use of high-gain antennas, and recovering every bit of telemetry is critical to assessing the health of the spacecraft and planning the recovery.

A famous example from Apollo was the Apollo 13 mission, where limited battery power and inability to use the spacecraft's high-gain antennas reduced signal levels below the capability of the MSFN, and the use of the biggest DSN antennas (and the Australian Parkes Observatory radio telescope) was critical to saving the lives of the astronauts.

Two antennas at each site were needed both for redundancy and because the beam widths of the large antennas needed were too small to encompass both the lunar orbiter and the lander at the same time. DSN also supplied some larger antennas as needed, in particular for television broadcasts from the Moon, and emergency communications such as Apollo 13.

From a NASA report describing how the DSN and MSFN cooperated for Apollo:

Another critical step in the evolution of the Apollo Network came in 1965 with the advent of the DSN Wing concept. Originally, the participation of DSN 26m antennas during an Apollo Mission was to be limited to a backup role. This was one reason why the MSFN 26m sites were collocated with the DSN sites at Goldstone, Madrid, and Canberra.

However, the presence of two, well-separated spacecraft during lunar operations stimulated the rethinking of the tracking and communication problem. One thought was to add a dual S-band RF system to each of the three 26m MSGN antennas, leaving the nearby DSN 26m antennas still in a backup role. Calculations showed, though, that a 26m antenna pattern centered on the landed Lunar Module would suffer a 9-to-12 db loss at the lunar horizon, making tracking and data acquisition of the orbiting Command Service Module difficult, perhaps impossible.

It made sense to use both the MSFN and DSN antennas simultaneously during the all-important lunar operations. JPL was naturally reluctant to compromise the objectives of its many unmanned spacecraft by turning three of its DSN stations over to the MSFN for long periods. How could the goals of both Apollo and deep space exploration be achieved without building a third 26m antenna at each of the three sites or undercutting planetary science missions?

The solution came in early 1965 at a meeting at NASA Headquarters, when Eberhardt Rechtin suggested what is now known as the "wing concept". The wing approach involves constructing a new section or "wing" to the main building at each of the three involved DSN sites. The wing would include a MSFN control room and the necessary interface equipment to accomplish the following:

1. Permit tracking and two-way data transfer with either spacecraft during lunar operations.
2. Permit tracking and two-way data transfer with the combined spacecraft during the flight to the Moon.
3. Provide backup for the collocated MSFN site passive track (spacecraft to ground RF links) of the Apollo spacecraft during trans-lunar and trans-earth phases.

With this arrangement, the DSN station could be quickly switched from a deep-space mission to Apollo and back again. GSFC personnel would operate the MSFN equipment completely independently of DSN personnel. Deep space missions would not be compromised nearly as much as if the entire station's equipment and personnel were turned over to Apollo for several weeks.

The details of this cooperation and operation are available in a two-volume technical report from JPL.

== The Viking Era 1974 to 1978 ==
The Viking program, mainly Viking 1 and Viking 2, forced some innovation to be done with respect to high power transmission to Mars, and reception and relay of landing craft telemetry.

The Viking craft eventually failed, one by one, as follows:

Craft	Arrival date	Shut-off date	Operational lifetime	Cause of failure
Viking 2 orbiter	August 7, 1976	July 25, 1978	1-year, 11 months, 18 days	Shut down after fuel leak in propulsion system.
Viking 2 lander	September 3, 1976	April 11, 1980	3 years, 7 months, 8 days	Battery failure.
Viking 1 orbiter	June 19, 1976	August 17, 1980	4 years, 1-month, 19 days	Shut down after depletion of attitude control fuel.
Viking 1 lander	July 20, 1976	November 13, 1982	6 years, 3 months, 22 days	Human error during software update caused the lander's antenna to go down, terminating communication.

The Viking program ended on May 21, 1983. To prevent an imminent impact with Mars the orbit of Viking 1 orbiter was raised. Impact and potential contamination on the planet's surface is possible from 2019 onwards.

The Viking 1 lander was found to be about 6 kilometers from its planned landing site by the Mars Reconnaissance Orbiter in December 2006.

The Viking 1 Lander touched down in western Chryse Planitia ("Golden Plain") at 22.697°N 48.222°W at a reference altitude of −2.69 km relative to a reference ellipsoid with an equatorial radius of 3397.2 km and a flatness of 0.0105 (22.480° N, 47.967° W planetographic) at 11:53:06 UT (16:13 local Mars time). Approximately 22 kg of propellants were left at landing.

Transmission of the first surface image began 25 seconds after landing and took about 4 minutes. During these minutes the lander activated itself. It erected a high-gain antenna pointed toward Earth for direct communication and deployed a meteorology boom mounted with sensors. In the next 7 minutes the second picture of the 300° panoramic scene was taken.

== The Voyager Era 1977 to 1986 ==
There were no Moon missions after 1972. Instead, there was an emphasis on Deep Space exploration in the 1980s. A modernization programme was launched to increase the size of the 64m antennas. From 1982 to 1988 the three 64-meter antennas of the Mars subnet in Goldstone, Spain, and Australia were extended to 70 meters.

The average improvement in performance of the three DSS stations of the subnet was over 2 db in the X-band due to the modernization. This performance increase was vital for the return of science data during Voyager's successful encounters with Uranus and Neptune, and the early stages of its interstellar mission. The modernization also extended the useful range of communications for Pioneer 10 from about 50 astronomical units to about 60 astronomical units at S-band.

After the Voyager Uranus flyby, the DSN demonstrated the capability of combining signals from the radio astronomy antenna at Parkes, Australia, with the Network antennas at Tidbinbilla. This DSS subnet capability is now a standard part of network operation.

The Voyager encounter of Neptune in August 1989 presented an additional challenge for the Network. The DSN personnel negotiated with several radio observatories the option of combining signals with the deep-space stations.

By arrangement the Very Large Array (VLA) had agreed to equip the 27 antennas with X-band receivers in order to communicate with Voyager at Neptune. The coupling of the VLA with the Goldstone antenna subnet made possible significant science data return, particularly for imaging the planet and its satellite and for detecting rings around Neptune.

== The Galileo Era 1986 to 1996 ==
DSN provides emergency service to other space agencies as well. For example, the recovery of the Solar and Heliospheric Observatory (SOHO) mission of the European Space Agency (ESA) would not have been possible without the use of the largest DSN facilities.
