= Stephen Crohn =

American man immune to HIV/AIDS due to a genetic mutation

- Born: Stephen Lyon Crohn; September 5, 1946; New York City, U.S.
- Died: August 23, 2013 (aged 66); New York City, U.S.
- Occupation: Artist

Stephen Lyon Crohn (September 5, 1946 – August 23, 2013), also known as "the man who can't catch AIDS", was a man notable for a genetic mutation that caused him to be immune to AIDS. He was a great-nephew of Burrill Bernard Crohn, for whom Crohn's disease is named.

Crohn had the Δ32 mutation on the CCR5 receptor, a protein on the surface of white blood cells that is involved in the immune system and serves as an access route for many forms of HIV to enter and infect host cells. This mutation rendered him effectively immune to many forms of HIV.

== Death ==
Crohn committed suicide by a drug overdose on oxycodone and benzodiazepines at the age of 66.

== See also ==
- Timothy Ray Brown
- Adam Castillejo
- Innate resistance to HIV
- Long-term nonprogressor
- HIV/AIDS research
