= Macie Roberts =

Former supervisor at NASA's Jet Propulsion Laboratory

Macie "Bobby" Roberts is a former supervisor at NASA's Jet Propulsion Laboratory (JPL). She was the supervisor for a group of women nicknamed "computers" during the 1960s. Roberts paved the way for the next generation of female supervisors and computers. The team that she led had their hands on almost every project at NASA before the development of physical computers.

== Early working life ==
Prior to working at JPL, Roberts worked as an auditor for the Internal Revenue Service (IRS).

== Career ==
As JPL expanded from rocket technology to missile technology the lab's director, Frank Malina promoted long time computer Macie Roberts to supervisor of the expanding division of female computers. Macie "Bobby" Roberts was the original supervisor of the human computers at NASA, later dubbed the rocket women. She believed that it would be too difficult to work with men, so she created a culture of all women that spanned much longer than her time at JPL. Roberts's job was not limited to just calculations, she hired and trained the new employees for over thirty years after being promoted. Her successor, Helen Ling, continued on the tradition of only hiring women. The women on Robert's team performed trajectory calculations for all space flights before the advent of the desktop computer.

One of the techniques that Roberts employed to find women for the job was to list the job as "not requiring a degree." This was code meant for women to know that the job was open to all women.

== Legacy ==
Her legacy was continued on by the supervisors that followed her. Many women that were just as smart as male engineers could not find work, but they were hired on to be rocket women at JPL. These women formed a sisterhood that has lived on throughout the lifetime of NASA.

== Famous quotes ==
"You have to look like a girl, act like a lady, think like a man, and work like a dog."
