= HIV/AIDS research =

Field of immunology research

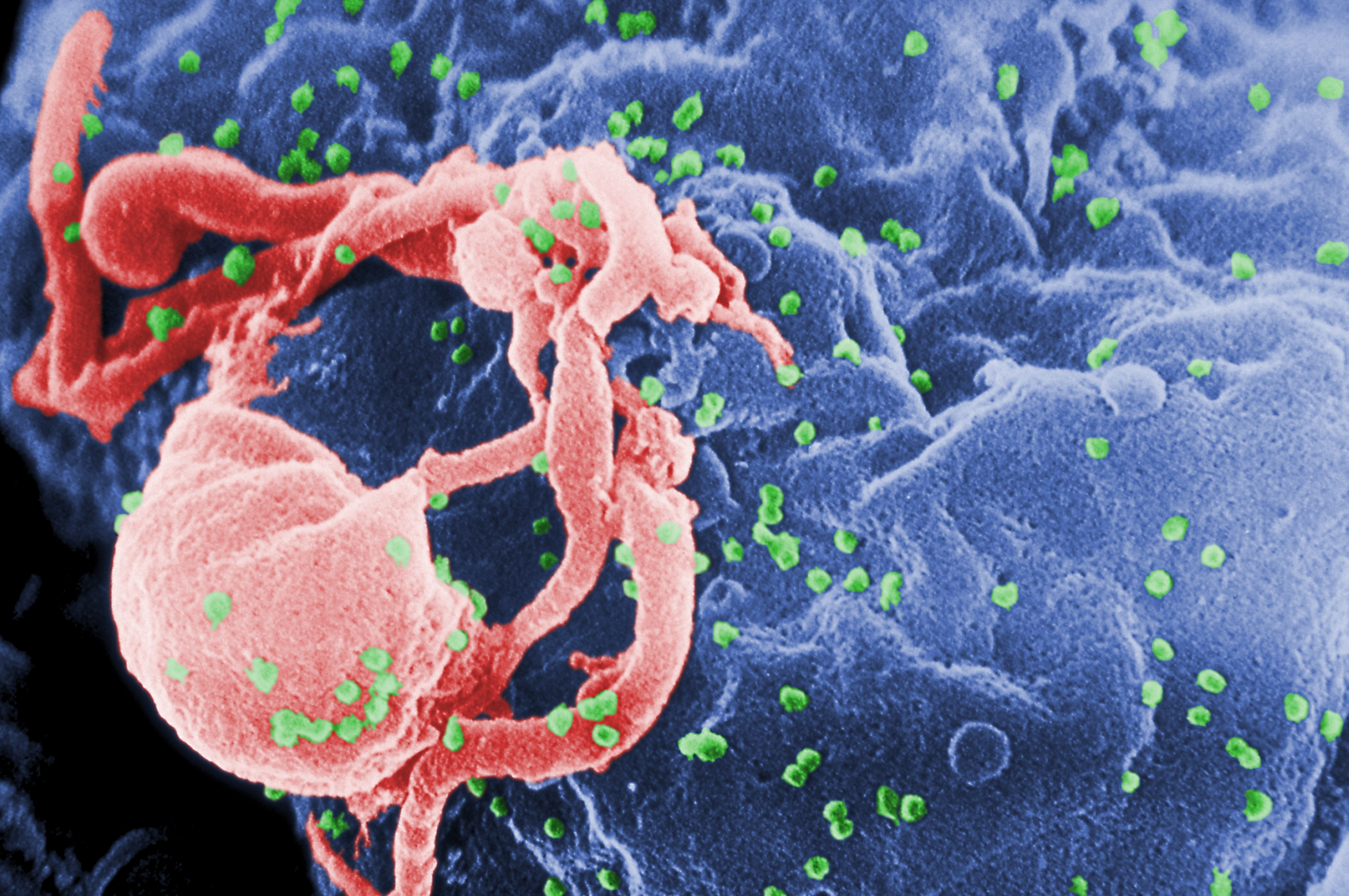
Scanning electron micrograph of HIV-1, colored green, budding from a cultured lymphocyte

Diagram of HIV

HIV/AIDS research includes all medical research that attempts to prevent, treat, or cure HIV/AIDS, as well as fundamental research about the nature of HIV as an infectious agent and AIDS as the disease caused by HIV.

== Transmission ==
A body of scientific evidence has shown that men who are circumcised are less likely to contract HIV than men who are uncircumcised. Research published in 2014 concludes that the sex hormones estrogen and progesterone selectively impact HIV transmission.

=== Pre- and post-exposure prophylaxis ===
"Pre-exposure prophylaxis" refers to the practice of taking some drugs before being exposed to HIV infection, and having a decreased chance of contracting HIV as a result of taking that drug. Post-exposure prophylaxis refers to taking some drugs quickly after being exposed to HIV, while the virus is in a person's body but before the virus has established itself. In both cases, the drugs would be the same as those used to treat persons with HIV, and the intent of taking the drugs would be to eradicate the virus before the person becomes irreversibly infected.

Post-exposure prophylaxis is recommended in anticipated cases of HIV exposure, such as if a nurse somehow has blood-to-blood contact with a patient in the course of work, or if someone without HIV requests the drugs immediately after having unprotected sex with a person who might have HIV. Pre-exposure prophylaxis is sometimes an option for HIV-negative persons who feel that they are at increased risk of HIV infection, such as an HIV-negative person in a serodiscordant relationship with an HIV-positive partner.

Current research in these agents include drug development, efficacy testing, and practice recommendations for using drugs for HIV prevention.

== Progression of HIV ==
The progression of HIV infection is analyzed by measuring the concentration of HIV virions (or viral load) and the concentration of CD4 T cells in the patient's bloodstream and lymphoid tissues. An untreated infection will progress in the following phases: Acute phase, chronic phase, and AIDS phase. In the Acute phase, the virions invade the host body and replicate expeditiously. The concentration of the virions increase vastly, while the concentration of CD4 T cells declines. After a spiked replication of HIV, the viral load and CD4 T cell count drops back down. Symptoms of acute HIV infection include fever, chills, rash, night sweats, muscle aches, and swollen lymph nodes. Acute symptoms occur usually 2–4 weeks after initial HIV infection and can last between a few days and several weeks

During the chronic phase, HIV will continue to replicate, but the concentration of virions tends to stabilize for a period of time before rising again. The CD4 T cell count continues to fall. Individuals in the chronic phase may not experience any symptoms. Left untreated, the chronic stage can last between 10 and 15 years. However, some individuals can move through this stage quickly to the AIDS phase.

An untreated HIV infection ultimately progresses to AIDS (acquired immunodeficiency syndrome). In the AIDS phase, the CD4 T-cell count significantly drops to below 200 cells per cubic millimeter. Individuals with AIDS become immunocompromised due to irreversible damage to the immune system and lymph nodes. The immune system does not have the ability to generate new T cells. Opportunistic infections, that a robust immune system could fight off, now are capable of causing severe symptoms and illnesses. Without a comprehensive anti-HIV drug therapy, an individual diagnosed with AIDS is expected to have less than three years to live.

== Immune system response to HIV ==
Once the retrovirus invades the body, the immune system mobilizes to fight against HIV infection. The first line of defense for the immune system utilizes dendritic cells. These cells actively patrol vulnerable tissue (i.e. lining of the digestive and reproductive tracts). Once a dendritic cell apprehends the virion invader, it will transport the virus to lymphoid tissue and introduce parts of the virus's proteins to Naive helper T cells (which are specialized white blood cells). The transported viral protein binds to the naive helper T cell's receptor, and the T cell activates. As the helper T cells grow and divide, they produce effecter helper T cells (which help coordinate the immune system response to HIV). The effector T cells utilize cytokines to mobilize other immune cells to join the combat against HIV. The cytokines promote the maturation of B cells into plasma cells. Then the plasma cells secrete antibodies that will bind to the HIV virions and target them for destruction. Finally, activated killer T-cells come in to eradicate the infected host cells.

== Within-host dynamics ==
The within-host dynamics of HIV infection include the spread of the virus in vivo, the establishment of latency, the effects of immune response on the virus, etc. Early studies used simple models and only considered the cell-free spreading of HIV, in which virus particles bud from an infected T cell, enter the blood/extracellular fluid, and then infect another T cell. A 2015 study proposes a more realistic model of HIV dynamics that also incorporates the viral cell-to-cell spreading mechanism, where the virus is directly transited from one cell to another, as well as the T cell activation, the cellular immune response, and the immune exhaustion as the infection progresses.

== Virus characteristics ==
HIV binds to immune cell surface receptors, including CD 4 and CXCR4 or CD4 and CCR5. The binding causes conformation changes and results in the membrane fusion between HIV and cell membrane. Active infection occurs in most cells, while latent infection occurs in much fewer cells 1, 2 and at very early stages of HIV infection. 9, 35 In active infection, HIV pro virus is active and HIV virus particles are actively replicated; and the infected cells continuously release viral progeny; while in latent infection, HIV pro virus is transcriptionally silenced and no viral progeny is produced.

== Management of HIV/AIDS ==
Research to improve current treatments includes decreasing side effects of current drugs, further simplifying drug regimens to improve adherence, and determining better sequences of regimens to manage drug resistance. There are variations in the health community in recommendations on what treatment doctors should recommend for people with HIV. One question, for example, is determining when a doctor should recommend that a patient take antiretroviral drugs and what drugs a doctor may recommend. This field also includes the development of antiretroviral drugs.

== Age acceleration effects due to HIV-1 infection ==
Infection with the Human Immunodeficiency Virus-1 (HIV) is associated with clinical symptoms of accelerated aging, as evidenced by increased incidence and diversity of age-related illnesses at relatively young ages. A significant age acceleration effect could be detected in brain (7.4 years) and blood (5.2 years) tissue due to HIV-1 infection with the help of a biomarker of aging, which is known as epigenetic clock.

== Long-term nonprogressor ==
A long-term nonprogressor is a person who is infected with HIV, but whose body, for whatever reason, naturally controls the virus so that the infection does not progress to the AIDS stage. Such persons are of great interest to researchers, who feel that a study of their physiologies could provide a deeper understanding of the virus and disease. There are also two cases where HIV was apparently entirely cleared by a person's immune system without a therapy.

== HIV vaccine ==
An HIV vaccine is a vaccine that would be given to a person who does not have HIV, in order to confer protection against subsequent exposures to HIV, thus reducing the likelihood that the person would become infected by HIV. Currently, no effective HIV vaccine exists. Various HIV vaccines have been tested in clinical trials almost since the discovery of HIV.

Only a vaccine is thought to be able to halt the pandemic. This is because a vaccine would cost less, thus being affordable for developing countries, and would not require daily treatment. However, after over 20 years of research, HIV-1 remains a difficult target for a vaccine.

In 2003 a clinical trial in Thailand tested an HIV vaccine called RV 144. In 2009, the researchers reported that this vaccine showed some efficacy in protecting recipients from HIV infection (31% efficiency). Results of this trial give the first supporting evidence of any vaccine being effective in lowering the risk of contracting HIV. Other vaccine trials continue worldwide including a mosaic vaccine using an adenovirus 26 vector as well as a newer formulation of RV144 called HVTN 702.

One recent trial was conducted by scientists at The Scripps Research Institute (TSRI) who found a way to attach HIV-fighting antibodies to immune cells, creating a HIV-resistant cell population.

== HIV cure ==
As of 2024, seven people have been reported cured of AIDS by stem cell transplants, five of those from donors with two copies of the CCR5-delta-32 mutation, which gives protection against HIV infection, and these have been dubbed as the "Berlin" (2008), "London" (2020), "Duesseldorf" (2022), "New York" (2022), and "City of Hope" (2023) patients. One case has been reported cured after five years on remission from a donor with only one copy of the mutation and named the "next Berlin" (2024) patient; the need for only one copy is important as it could potentially extend the numbers of possible donors. Finally, one case named the "Geneva" (2023) patient has been reported as cured by a stem cell transplant with no copy of the mutation. Nevertheless, two previous cases that received transplants without mutation and were apparently cured, known as the "Boston" (2013) patients later rebounded after three and eight months, while the Geneva case had been free of the virus for 20 months by the time it was reported. The CCR5 receptor is not the only one that the virus uses as an entry point; some strains use the CXCR4 receptor, for example, so even ignoring all impracticalities of this treatment other challenges would still need to be explored.

In 2019, the NIH and Bill & Melinda Gates Foundation announced making $200 million available for broad-based, multi-prong scientific efforts focused on developing a global cure for AIDS as well as for sickle cell disease, with NIH Director Francis S. Collins saying, "We aim to go big or we go home." In 2020, Tony Fauci's division at NIH, NIAID, issued its first solicitation exclusively focused on methods to cure HIV infection. These announcements from NIH are not limited to stem cell therapies.

Excision BioTherapeutics is a biotechnology company with "a first"-in-human CRISPR-based one-time gene therapy to be evaluated in individuals with HIV. The Research Foundation to Cure AIDS (the RFTCA) is the first 501(c)(3) non-for-profit organization with a royalty-free license to research, develop and commercialize a cell engineering technology in the field of curing AIDS on a pro bono basis.

== Initial stem cell cures of HIV/AIDS ==
In 2007, Timothy Ray Brown, a 40-year-old HIV-positive man, also known as "the Berlin Patient", was given a stem cell transplant as part of his treatment for acute myeloid leukemia (AML). A second transplant was made a year later after a relapse. The donor was chosen not only for genetic compatibility but also for being homozygous for a CCR5-Δ32 mutation that confers resistance to HIV infection. After 20 months without antiretroviral drug treatment, it was reported that HIV levels in Brown's blood, bone marrow, and bowel were below the limit of detection. The virus remained undetectable over three years after the first transplant. Although the researchers and some commentators have characterized this result as a cure, others suggest that the virus may remain hidden in tissues such as the brain (which acts as a viral reservoir). Stem cell treatment remains investigational because of its anecdotal nature, the disease and mortality risk associated with stem cell transplants, and the difficulty of finding suitable donors. As of 2024, there have been seven patients cured by stem cell transplants (see previous section).

== Microbicides for sexually transmitted diseases ==
A microbicide for sexually transmitted diseases is a gel which would be applied to the skin – perhaps a rectal microbicide for persons who engage in anal sex or a vaginal microbicide for persons who engage in vaginal sex – and if infected body fluid such as blood or semen were to touch the gel, then HIV in that fluid would be destroyed and the people having sex would be less likely to spread infection between themselves.

On March 7, 2013, the Washington University in St. Louis website published a report by Julia Evangelou Strait, in which it was reported that ongoing nanoparticle research showed that nanoparticles loaded with various compounds could be used to target infectious agents whilst leaving healthy cells unaffected. In the study detailed by this report, it was found that nanoparticles loaded with Mellitin, a compound found in Bee venom, could deliver the agent to the HIV, causing the breakdown of the outer protein envelope of the virus. This, they say, could lead to the production of a vaginal gel which could help prevent infection by disabling the virus. Dr Joshua Hood goes on to explain that beyond preventive measures in the form of a topical gel, he sees "potential for using nanoparticles with melittin as therapy for existing HIV infections, especially those that are drug-resistant. The nanoparticles could be injected intravenously and, in theory, would be able to clear HIV from the blood stream."

== Strategies to develop broadly-applicable cures ==
Scientists have been using different approaches of stem cell based gene therapy in an attempt to develop a cure as well as to propose an alternative to the conventional antiretroviral therapy (ART). Specifically, advances had been made with a cure to HIV.

A cellular receptor, generally CCR5 or CXCR4 is required in order for HIV entry into CD4 cells. Cells of individuals homozygous for the CCR5 gene variant Δ32 (CCR5Δ32/Δ32) lack the CCR5 cell-surface expression, meaning that they are naturally resistant to infection with CCR5 tropic HIV strains (R5 HIV). One study done in 2011 achieves successful CD4+ T-cell reconstitution as a result of CCR5Δ32/Δ32 stem cell transplantation at the systemic level and in the gut mucosal immune system in a patient with HIV. Additionally, it provides evidence for the reduction in the size of the potential HIV reservoir over time. The patient in this study even remained HIV free without any evidence of having it for more than 3.5 years.

Other theoretical cures to HIV-1 have been proposed. One supposed cure to HIV-1 involves the creation of a disease-resistant immune system through transplantation of autologous, gene-modified (HIV-1-resistant) hematopoietic stem cells and progenitor cells (GM-HSPC). Though this study does involve several early stage clinical trials that have demonstrated the safety and feasibility of this technique only for HIV-1, none have resulted in improvement of the disease state itself. Therefore, this strategy is intended to go alongside already existing treatment techniques such as drugs and vaccines. However, future technology regarding this approach of single treatment cell therapy could potentially replace current therapy altogether as a functional or sterilizing cure to HIV-1.

An additional study involves the use of genetically engineered CD34+ hematopoietic stem and progenitor cells. Experimental long-term in vivo HIV gene therapy have had huge issues due to both transduction ending in multiple copies of heterologous DNA in target cells as well as low efficacy of cell transduction at the time of transplantation. This study demonstrated the efficacy of a transplantation approach that ultimately allows for an enriched population of HSPCs expressing a single copy of a CCR5 miRNA. Since positive selection of modified cells is likely to be insufficient below the threshold they found of at least 70% of the HIV target cells resulting in gene modification from efficient maintenance of CD34+ T cell and a low viral titer, the findings show evidence that clinical protocols of HIV gene therapy require a selective enrichment of genetically targeted cells.

== Immunomodulatory agents ==
Complementing efforts to control viral replication, immunotherapies that may assist in the recovery of the immune system have been explored in past and ongoing trials, including IL-2 and IL-7.

The failure of vaccine candidates to protect against HIV infection and progression to AIDS has led to a renewed focus on the biological mechanisms responsible for HIV latency. A limited period of therapy combining anti-retrovirals with drugs targeting the latent reservoir may one day allow for total eradication of HIV infection. Researchers have discovered an abzyme that can destroy the protein gp120 CD4 binding site. This protein is common to all HIV variants as it is the attachment point for B lymphocytes and subsequent compromising of the immune system.

== New developments ==
A turning point for HIV research occurred in 2007, following the bone marrow transplant of HIV sufferer Timothy Ray Brown. Brown underwent the procedure after he developed leukaemia and the donor of the bone marrow possessed a rare genetic mutation that caused Brown's cells to become resistant to HIV. Brown attained the title of the "Berlin Patient" in the HIV research field and is the first man to have been cured of the virus. As of April 2013, two primary approaches are being pursued in the search for a HIV cure: The first is gene therapy that aims to develop a HIV-resistant immune system for patients, and the second is being led by Danish scientists, who are conducting clinical trials to strip the HIV from human DNA and have it destroyed permanently by the immune system.

Three more cases with similarities to the Brown case have occurred since the 2007 discovery; however, they differ because the transplanted marrow has not been confirmed as mutated. Two of the cases were publicized in a July 2013 CNN story that relayed the experience of two patients who had taken antiretroviral therapy for years before they developed lymphoma, a cancer of the lymph nodes. They then underwent lymphoma chemotherapy and bone marrow transplantation, while remaining on an antiretroviral regimen; while they retained traces of HIV four months afterwards, six to nine months after the transplant, the two patients had no detectable trace of HIV in their blood. However, the managing clinician Dr. Timothy Heinrich stated at the Malaysian International AIDS Society Conference where the findings were presented:

It's possible, again, that the virus could return in a week, it could return in a month—in fact, some mathematical modeling predicts that virus could even return one to two years after we stop antiretroviral therapy, so we really don't know what the long-term or full effects of stem cell transplantation and viral persistence is.

In 2014, Dr Warner C. Greene and Dr Gilad Doitsh at the Gladstone Institutes identified pyroptosis as the predominant mechanism that causes the two signature pathogenic events in HIV infection––CD4 T-cell depletion and chronic inflammation. Identifying pyroptosis may provide novel therapeutic opportunities targeting caspase-1, which controls the pyroptotic cell death pathway. Specifically, these findings could open the door to an entirely new class of "anti-AIDS" therapies that act by targeting the host rather than the virus. Recently, pyroptosis and downstream pathways were also identified as promising targets for treatment of severe coronavirus disease 2019–associated diseases.

In March 2016, researchers at Temple University, Philadelphia, reported that they have used genome editing to delete HIV from T cells. According to the researchers, this approach could lead to a dramatic reduction of the viral load in patient cells.

In April 2016, it was announced the publication of a preclinical animal study using SupT1 cells as a decoy target for the HIV virus, aiming to move infection from the patient's cells to the inoculated cells, and therefore to induce the virus to become less aggressive by replicating in such permissive cells.

In March 2019, a patient with Hodgkin's lymphoma was also reported to possibly have been cured using similar treatment to Brown.

In 2022, Moderna announced that the first participants have been vaccinated in a Phase 1 clinical trial of an experimental HIV vaccine that utilizes Moderna's mRNA technology.

In 2023, Excision BioTherapeutics has conducted a clinical trial for EBT-101 a gene therapy using CRISPR and tested it in three patients.

== See also ==
- Broadly neutralizing HIV-1 antibodies
- Discovery and development of CCR5 receptor antagonists
- Discovery and development of HIV-protease inhibitors
- Discovery and development of non-nucleoside reverse-transcriptase inhibitors
- Discovery and development of nucleoside and nucleotide reverse-transcriptase inhibitors
- Health interventions
- History of HIV/AIDS
- HIV superinfection
- Innate resistance to HIV
- Sex education
