= Susan G. Finley =

Software engineer

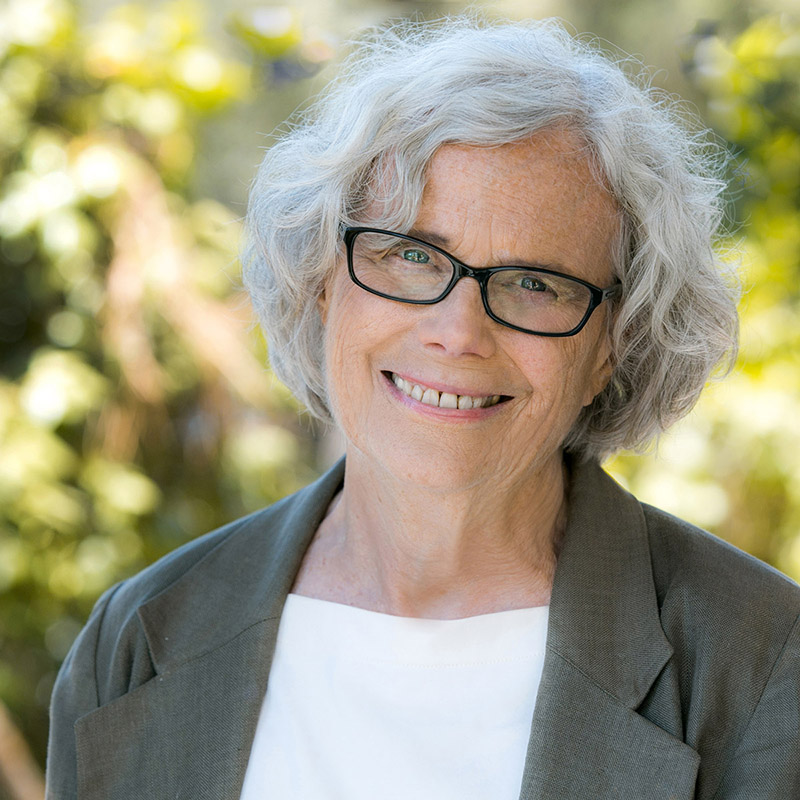
- Born: 1936 or 1937 (age 89–90)
- Education: Scripps College (attended)
- Known for: Computing, engineering
- Children: Two sons
- Awards: NASA Group Achievement Award
- Scientific career
- Fields: Engineering
- Workplaces: Convair; Jet Propulsion Laboratory

Susan G. Finley, a native Californian, has been an employee of NASA's Jet Propulsion Laboratory (JPL) since January 1958, making her the longest-serving woman in NASA. Two days before Explorer 1 was launched, Finley began her career with the laboratory as a human computer, calculating rocket launch trajectories by hand. She now serves as a subsystem engineer for NASA's Deep Space Network (DSN). At JPL, she has participated in the exploration of the Moon, the Sun, all the planets, and other bodies in the Solar System.

== Life and education ==
=== Education ===
In 1955, Susan Finley began studying art and architecture at Scripps College, in Claremont, California, with the intention of becoming an architect. Her knowledge of engineering was vast because of her talents in mathematical and drafting courses, so she attempted to learn art, but later realized that engineering was in her future. After three years at Scripps College, Finley claimed she "couldn't learn art." During her college experience, she majored in the humanities which allowed her to be successful as a subsystem engineer. At the age of 21, she left Scripps College to become a "computer" with a thermodynamics group at Convair in Pomona, California.

=== Family life ===
At the beginning of her career, Finley made sacrifices in her career for her family. Susan Finley married Pete Finley and had two sons together. She left JPL twice in the first few years of employment in order to support her husband's education and also took maternity leave for some time for her two sons, returning permanently to JPL in 1969. Susan Finley divorced her husband Pete in the 1970s. According to Susan Finley, balancing her work and family lives was difficult because of the "lack of good child care options," although she believes that women still face these struggles today. One of her goals was to keep her work and home life separate, aiming to never bring her work home with her or "working late without making up that time at home." She cooked all the meals for her family, but did not spend much time on housework. Her husband, on the other hand, worked on the cars and the yard as he was of the "generation that did not help with the house or children".

== Career ==
Finley dropped out of Scripps College, after three years of studying, and applied for a filing clerk position at Convair in Pomona, California. Convair was an aircraft and rocket manufacturing company that no longer exists. Finley took a required typing test to compare her abilities with other candidates. After completing the test, Convair informed Finley that the job had been filled. Instead, the company asked Finley her thoughts on working with numbers. Finley explained how her passion for numbers was greater than that of letters. She began her work, hand-calculating nose cone thermodynamic expected results, as a human computer. In 1957, after her marriage, Finley moved to San Gabriel, California. She expressed her concerns to her husband about the commute to and from work each day. Finley worked for a year with Convair until she pursued a new opportunity of which her husband suggested. In 1958, Susan Finley took a position at the Jet Propulsion Laboratory (JPL) in Pasadena, California, as a computer. NASA, the National Aeronautics and Space Administration, had officially formed in July 1958. This was a response to the National Aeronautics and Space Act. This act was put into action shortly after the Soviet Union launched its satellite, Sputnik. Prior to the National Aeronautics and Space Act of 1958, all space exploration was deemed by the country, the military's responsibility. Shortly thereafter, NASA assumed control of the Jet Propulsion Laboratory (JPL). In the 1950s, computers were mostly women who solved complex problems by hand. Many women did not have degrees. Rather, like Finley, they were good with numbers. Being a computer required Finley to perform "trajectory computations for rocket launches by hand". Two days after Finley was hired, the Jet Propulsion Laboratory launched the United States' first-ever satellite: Explorer 1. Finley's most-remembered contribution to the Jet Propulsion Laboratory (JPL) came in 1958. JPL launched Pioneer 3 on December 6, 1958. Its mission was to orbit around the Moon and enter a solar orbit, but Pioneer 3 failed its mission. A digital computer failed to correctly calculate the probe's velocity data. Following the failure, the Jet Propulsion Laboratory asked Finley to calculate the velocity data of Pioneer 3, and she was successful in providing the sought after information. On January 26, 1962, NASA launched Ranger 3. Ranger 3 was of great importance as it was NASA's first attempt to hardland a spacecraft of the surface of the Moon. Much to their disappointment, Ranger 3 missed the moon by 22,000 miles, due to multiple malfunctions within the spacecraft's guidance system. It was a calculation Finley made that demonstrated to NASA that Ranger 3 had missed the Moon by such a large margin. Susan Finley took a leave of absence from the Jet Propulsion Laboratory (JPL) to allow her husband to begin his graduate degree at the University of California, Riverside.

Between jobs, Susan Finley took a short course in FORTRAN in Riverside. FORTRAN, is the primary computer programming language developed by IBM in the 1950s for scientific applications. Male engineers largely didn't want to do the programming themselves in the 1960s. The advent of electronic computers slowly changed what the all-female computations group did. It was still considered "women's work," not part of an engineer's job description. Finley returned to the Jet Propulsion Laboratory (JPL) in 1962 once her husband finished his master's degree. A year later, Finley left the Jet Propulsion Laboratory again to take care of her two sons. In 1969, Finley returned to the Jet Propulsion Laboratory, and would not leave again. This marked Susan Finley's transition from a human computer to a human programmer. Throughout her career, Finley provided both manual computation work and FORTRAN programs as part of JPL's missions to the Moon, Mars, Venus, Mercury, Jupiter, Saturn, Uranus, and Neptune, in the Ranger, Mariner, Pioneer, Viking, and Voyager programs.

By the 1970s, teams of female programmers were integrated with male engineers of the same mission. Prior to the 1970s, they were kept apart. Susan Finley went on record as saying "the men always, from the very beginning, treated us as equals. We were doing something they couldn't do, and that they needed to go forward with what they were doing." Later, in the 1980s, Finley switched to software testing and subsystem engineering for the NASA Deep Space Network (DSN). A systems engineer in the context of NASA "encourages the use of tools and methods to better comprehend and manage complexity in systems". The DSN is used to track and communicate with every deep space probe sponsored by NASA as well as non-US space missions. They would communicate by sending commands to the probe, transmit software updates, as well as gather data. The research group tracked the Russian spacecraft Vega which carried a French balloon to Venus on its journey to Halley's comet. Although working with the Russians was difficult during this Cold War time period, her team was able to collaborate well with the French and they successfully delivered tracking data for the French balloon to route toward the comet. Finley's contribution was a program that automated the movements and translations of the platform's antenna. More specifically, the antenna had to be aligned with the spacecraft. Otherwise, no data would be received. Finley considers this project the most memorable of her many years at NASA.

In the 1990s and 2000s, Finley contributed to JPL's further explorations of the solar system. Finley worked with the Mars Exploration Rover missions and helped developed technology in which radio tones were sent at differing phases of descent through the Martian atmosphere and were transmitted back to DSN. The program received the rover tones back at the DSN antenna and translated into words signaling each stage of the craft's descent and sent this information to the command center. The engineers were then able to use this information to determine which landing stage the spacecraft was in at a given time. This process (with 4 tones vs 256) was utilized in 1997 for the Pathfinder. However, the program was left out of the Climate Orbiter and Polar Lander Mars missions. Both the Climate Orbiter and the Polar Lander were lost in 1999. NASA attempted to find the causes for each of the failures. Fortunately for NASA, Finley's tones assisted in finding the issues with each of the two failed missions. The engineers used Finley's tones to update the whereabouts of the platforms in their last minutes. Finley was stationed at the Goldstone and Tidbinbilla stations while the landings were taking place and was the first to hear the tones that confirmed the landers survived their trip to Mars. Unfortunately, her work went unrecognized in the media because they reported from JPL's mission control only. In 2004, Finley's tones returned to the Marian landing process of different components. Susan Finley explained that all of the Mars missions that carried the tones were a success. It was not until the Mars Polar Lander (MPL) mission failed where mission designers recognized the value of the tones Finley was responsible for.

In 2008, the Jet Propulsion Laboratory (JPL) reviewed their job listings and each of their employees education. Finley was demoted from a salaried engineer to being paid by the hour. Finley was now an hourly engineering specialist. This was due to her lack of a Bachelor's Degree. Although Finley's overall pay did not change, she remained eligible for overtime. The only downside being she now had to clock in and clock out.

She continues to work full-time for JPL and is involved in DSN support for NASA's recent space probe missions, including the Pluto flyby by the New Horizons spacecraft and the Juno mission to Jupiter.

== Awards and honors ==
- 2013 - NASA Group Achievement Award, NASA (nine certificates awarded to Susan Finley)
- 2018 - NASA Exceptional Public Service Medal

Over the course of her career, Finley has won several NASA Group Achievement Awards. This certificate is "awarded to any combination of government and/or non-government individuals for an outstanding group accomplishment that has contributed substantially to NASA's mission".

In 2018, Finley was awarded a NASA Exceptional Public Service Medal "This prestigious NASA medal is awarded to any non-Government individual or to an individual who was not a Government employee during the period in which the service was performed for sustained performance that embodies multiple contributions on NASA projects, programs, or initiatives." Her years of dedication and service to the National Aeronautics and Space Administration (NASA) have made her the longest-serving woman in the space agency. JPL is technically a division of Caltech, so JPL employees don't qualify for governmental individual awards.

== Publications ==
- 2004 "Tracking Capability for Entry, Descent and Landing and its support to NASA Mars Exploration Rovers," ResearchGate
- 2009 "Receiver filters and records IF analog signals," National Aeronautics and Space Administration
- 2012 "Spacecraft-to-earth communications for Juno and Mars Science Laboratory critical events," IEEE Xplore
- 2013 "Improved spacecraft tracking and navigation using a Portable Radio Science Receiver," IEEE Xplore
- 2013 "Sleuthing the MSL EDL performance from an X band carrier perspective," IEEE Xplore
- 2014 "Design and implementation of a Deep Space Communications Complex downlink array," IEEE Xplore
- 2016 "A comparison of atmospheric effects on differential phase for a two-element antenna array and nearby site test interferometer", IEEE Xplore

== See also ==
- Women in science
- Association for Women in Science
- List of organizations for women in science
- List of female scientists before the 20th century
