= Excision BioTherapeutics =

American biotechnology company

- Company type: Privately held company
- Industry: Pharmaceutical; Medical Technology
- Founded: January 2015; 11 years ago in Philadelphia, Pennsylvania, United States
- Founders: Kamel Khalili
- Headquarters: US
- Area served: Worldwide
- Website: excision.bio

Excision BioTherapeutics was a biopharmaceutical company based in San Francisco focused on developing gene therapies against HIV infection.

The company had a single, CRISPR–Cas9 based therapy, EBT-101, that was under investigation. Initial investigation into the therapy was conducted by the lab of Kamel Khalili, a professor at Temple University. In July 2023 the US Food and Drug Administration granted EBT-101 fast-track status. In October 2023 an early-stage study on 3 people reported that the treatment appeared to be safe with no major side effects. In March 2024 it was revealed that EBT-101 did not maintain HIV viral suppression when used alone at the initial dose tested, although it might have delayed viral rebound in one trial participant. One possible explanation for the viral rebound is that EBT-101 did not reach all of the cells that harboured latent HIV.

A long-term follow-up study of HIV-1 infected adults who received EBT-101 was also started.

== See also ==
- CRISPR gene editing#HIV/AIDS
