= Timothy Ray Brown =

First person known to have been cured of HIV/AIDS

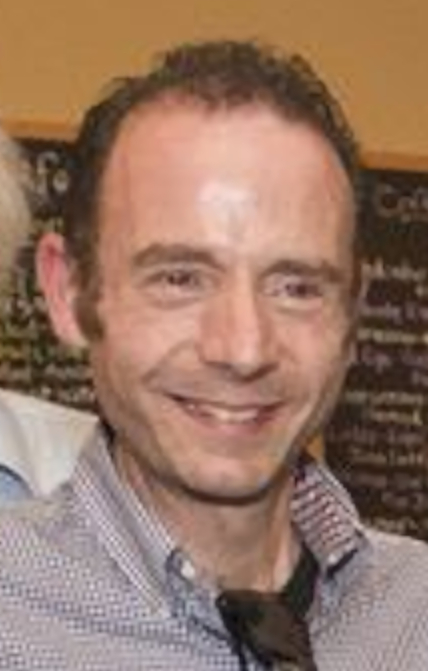
- Brown in 2012
- Born: March 11, 1966; Seattle, Washington, U.S.
- Died: September 29, 2020 (aged 54); Palm Springs, California, U.S.
- Known for: First person cured of HIV/AIDS

Timothy Ray Brown (March 11, 1966 – September 29, 2020) was an American considered to be the first person cured of HIV/AIDS. Brown was called "The Berlin Patient" at the 2008 Conference on Retroviruses and Opportunistic Infections, where his cure was first announced, in order to preserve his anonymity. He chose to come forward in 2010. "I didn't want to be the only person cured," he said. "I wanted to do what I could to make [a cure] possible. My first step was releasing my name and image to the public."

== Procedure ==
Timothy Ray Brown was born in Seattle, Washington, on March 11, 1966, and raised in the area by his single mother, Sharon, who worked for the King County sheriff's department. He journeyed across Europe as a young adult and was diagnosed with HIV in 1995 while studying in Berlin. In 2006, he was diagnosed with acute myeloid leukemia. On February 7, 2007, he underwent a procedure known as hematopoietic stem cell transplantation to treat leukemia (performed by a team of doctors in Berlin, Germany, including Gero Hütter). From 60 matching donors, they selected a [CCR5]-Δ32 homozygous donor, an individual with two genetic copies of a rare variant of a cell surface receptor. This genetic trait confers resistance to HIV infection by blocking attachment of HIV to the cell. Roughly one in 1,000 people of European ancestry have this inherited mutation, but it is rarer in other populations. The transplant was repeated a year later after a leukemia relapse. Over the three years after the initial transplant, and despite discontinuing antiretroviral therapy, researchers could not detect HIV in Brown's blood or in various biopsies. Levels of HIV-specific antibodies in Timothy Brown's blood also declined, suggesting that functional HIV may have been eliminated from his body. However, scientists studying his case warn that this remission of HIV infection is unusual.

Brown, the "Berlin patient", suffered from serious transplant complications, graft-versus-host disease and leukoencephalopathy, which led researchers to conclude that the procedure should not be performed on others with HIV, even if sufficient numbers of suitable donors could be found.

Eleven years later, at the same conference, it was announced that it appeared that a second man had been cured. He was called "The London Patient", who later identified himself as Adam Castillejo. He also received a bone marrow transplant to treat a cancer (Hodgkin's lymphoma) but was given weaker immunosuppressive drugs. The selected donor also carried the CCR5-Δ32 mutation.

As of 2017, six more people also appear to have been cleared of HIV after getting graft-versus-host disease; only one of them had received CCR5 mutant stem cells, leading researchers to conclude that when a transplant recipient has graft-versus-host disease, the transplanted cells may kill off the host's HIV-infected immune cells.

== Later life ==
In July 2012, Brown announced the formation of the Timothy Ray Brown Foundation in Washington, D.C., a foundation dedicated to fighting HIV/AIDS.

In September 2020, Brown revealed the leukemia that prompted his historic treatment had returned in 2019 and that he was terminally ill. Brown entered hospice care in Palm Springs, California, where he later died on September 29, 2020. He was 54 years old.

== See also ==
- Berlin patient (1998)
- Adam Castillejo
- Stephen Crohn
- Innate resistance to HIV
- Long term non progressor
- HIV/AIDS research
