= Gero Hütter =

German hematologist

- Born: 18 December 1968 (age 57); Germany
- Occupation: Hematologist

Gero Hütter (born 18 December 1968) is a German hematologist. Hütter and his medical team transplanted bone marrow deficient in a key HIV receptor to a leukemia patient, Timothy Ray Brown, who was also infected with human immunodeficiency virus (HIV). Subsequently, the patient's circulating HIV dropped to undetectable levels. The case was widely reported in the media, and Hütter was named one of the "Berliners of the year" for 2008 by the Berliner Morgenpost, a Berlin newspaper.

== HIV treatment ==
In 2009, Hütter, Eckhard Thiel and others from the Charité Hospital in Berlin, Germany, published a report on the case in the New England Journal of Medicine. Their patient Timothy Ray Brown, a US citizen born in Seattle, Washington, and living in Berlin, had both acute myelogenous leukemia (AML) and HIV. The physicians found a bone marrow donor with a CCR5-Δ32 mutation in both genomic copies of a gene encoding a cell-surface chemokine receptor called CCR5. Because "most of HIV strains" use the CCR5 receptor to enter a host cell, the mutation confers resistance to HIV infection. The patient himself was heterozygous for CCR5-Δ32. Following the transplant procedure, the patient's CD4+ T-cells circulating in the blood were homozygous for CCR5-Δ32. The macrophages in his bowel, which continued to express wildtype CCR5 (because they hadn't been replaced yet from bone marrow precursors), also had no detectable virus. After 600 days without antiretroviral drug treatment, the patient's blood, bone marrow and bowel HIV levels were below the limit of detection; the virus was thought to be present in other tissues. However, the patient actually had a brain biopsy, in addition to biopsies of his intestines, liver, lymph nodes, bone marrow—basically, every part of the body that can be biopsied. All were negative for virus. There is no virus in this person's body out to two and a half years off of all anti-HIV drugs. His antibody levels—called titers—are declining just the way expected if the patient was vaccinated against HIV and then the levels of antibodies were examined. They'd be very strong in the beginning, but would weaken if they are not re-exposed to the virus. It is believed this patient has no HIV in his body and therefore there is nothing to re-expose him, so the concentration of HIV antibodies in his blood is decreasing. It is predicted that, in a couple of years, his HIV antibody test will be negative.

The mortality risk associated with bone marrow transplants is thought to contraindicate the use of this experimental treatment for HIV-positive individuals without leukemia or lymphoma. Some researchers such as Edward Berger believe that resistance to CCR5 inhibition may emerge if CXCR4 strains of HIV emerge (these use CXCR4 rather than CCR5 as a coreceptor, from which they become independent). Before the treatment though the patient had low levels of the CXCR4 virus but after the treatment this type of HIV could not be detected either which Hütter called "very surprising". People without CCR5 can be more sensitive to some infections such as West Nile virus.

Jay Levy, one of the first researchers to isolate and describe HIV in the early 1980s, wrote an editorial accompanying Hütter's publication in the New England Journal of Medicine. Noting the reduction in detectable HIV in the patient's blood and the return of the patient's circulating CD4+ T-cell population to normal levels, with all of the cells expressing the resistant variant of CCR5, Levy cautions that calling this treatment a cure would be premature. This is because HIV is known to hide in latent form in a variety of organs not easily sampled, including the heart and brain. The high risks of a bone marrow transplant also make this treatment risky since many bone marrow patients die. And the CXCR4 virus that was detectable in the blood of the patient before the treatment "could eventually emerge". Levy does believe though that this case "could pave the way for innovative approaches that provide long-lasting viral control with limited toxicities for persons with HIV infection".

As of June 4, 2010, Hütter's patient was in very good health and had been HIV- and cancer-free (combined) for two years. In the March 10, 2011, issue of the medical journal Blood, Hütter wrote, "it is reasonable to conclude that cure of HIV infection has been achieved in this patient." Hütter concurred with this assessment.

Hütter received an award on June 3, 2010, from the AIDS Policy Project, a national advocacy group focused on an AIDS cure, and San Francisco Supervisor Ross Mirkarimi on behalf of the people of San Francisco.

The text read:

"Dr. Gero Hütter: In recognition of your historic achievement of being the first doctor to functionally cure AIDS/HIV through an innovative procedure that entails a remarkable example of the use of stem cell transplants. We join you with hope that your achievement will globally inspire researchers to explore new techniques and technologies for an AIDS cure. On behalf of the people of San Francisco, the AIDS Policy Project, and all those engaged in the combat against the HIV disease, the City and County of San Francisco extends its highest commendation!" —Supervisor Ross Mirkarimi, Member, San Francisco Board of Supervisors, June 3, 2010

== See also ==
- Gene therapy
