= Adam Castillejo =

Second person known to have been cured of HIV infection

Ambassador of Hope Adam Castillejo
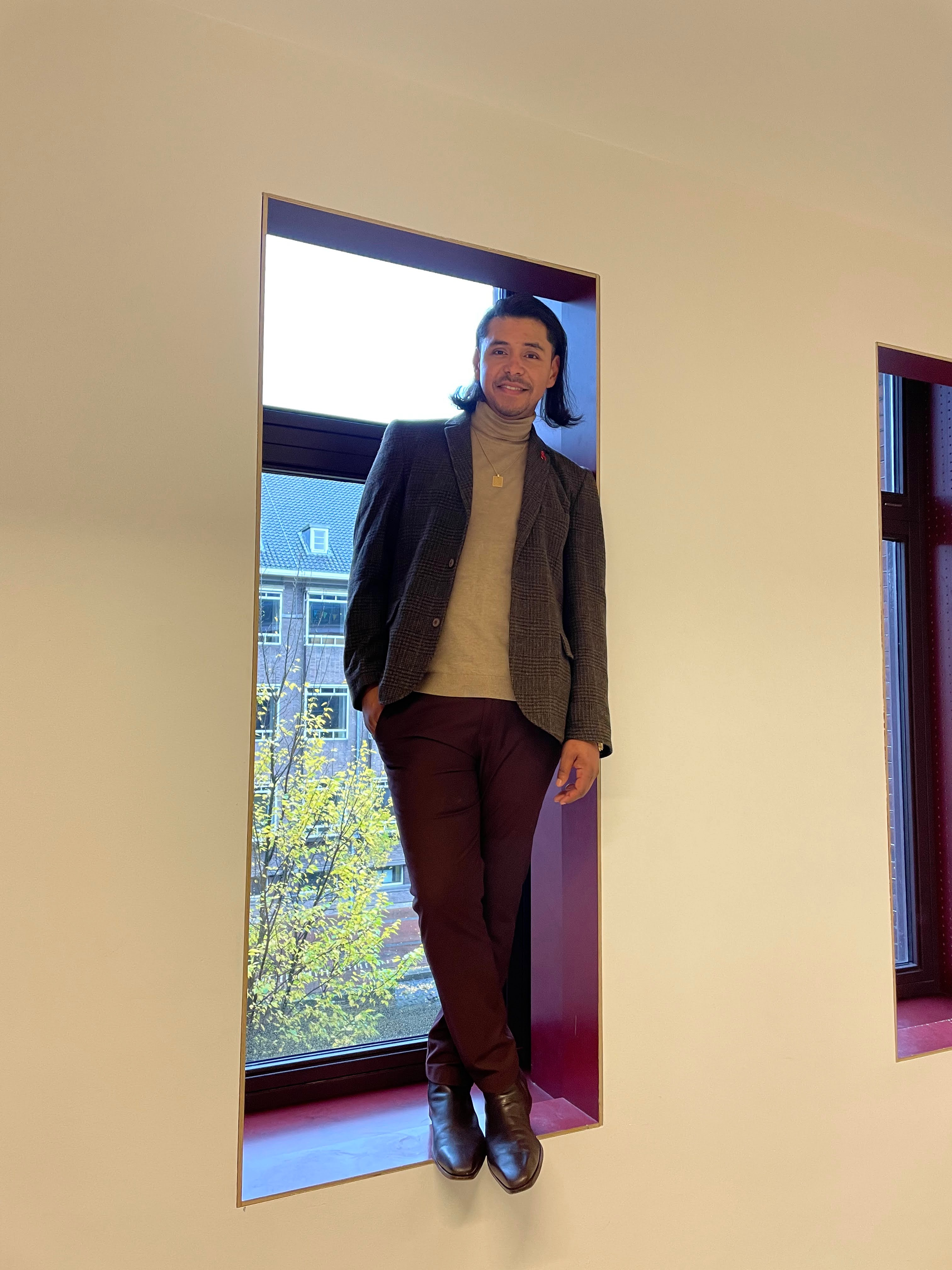
- Castillejo in 2020
- Born: 1979 or 1980 (age 46–47); Caracas, Venezuela
- Other name: The London Patient
- Citizenship: British-Venezuelan
- Years active: 2020–present
- Known for: Second person known to have been cured of HIV infection through Bone Marrow Transplant required to treat Stage IV Hodgkins Lymphoma
- Website: https://thelondonpatient.org

Adam Castillejo (born 1979 or 1980), also known as "The London Patient", is the second person known to have been cured of HIV infection. Castillejo, who is British-Venezuelan and has mixed European ancestry, lives in London. He has previously worked as a chef and is now a motivational speaker.

Diagnosed in 2003, his body became resistant to HIV infection after receiving a bone marrow transplant in 2016 to treat Hodgkin's lymphoma. The German donor carried the CCR5-Δ32 mutation which gives resistance from HIV infection. He was treated by Professor Ravindra Gupta.

== See also ==
- Timothy Ray Brown
- Stephen Crohn
- Innate resistance to HIV
- Long term nonprogressor
- HIV/AIDS research
