= Rocket Girls (NASA) =

Human computers

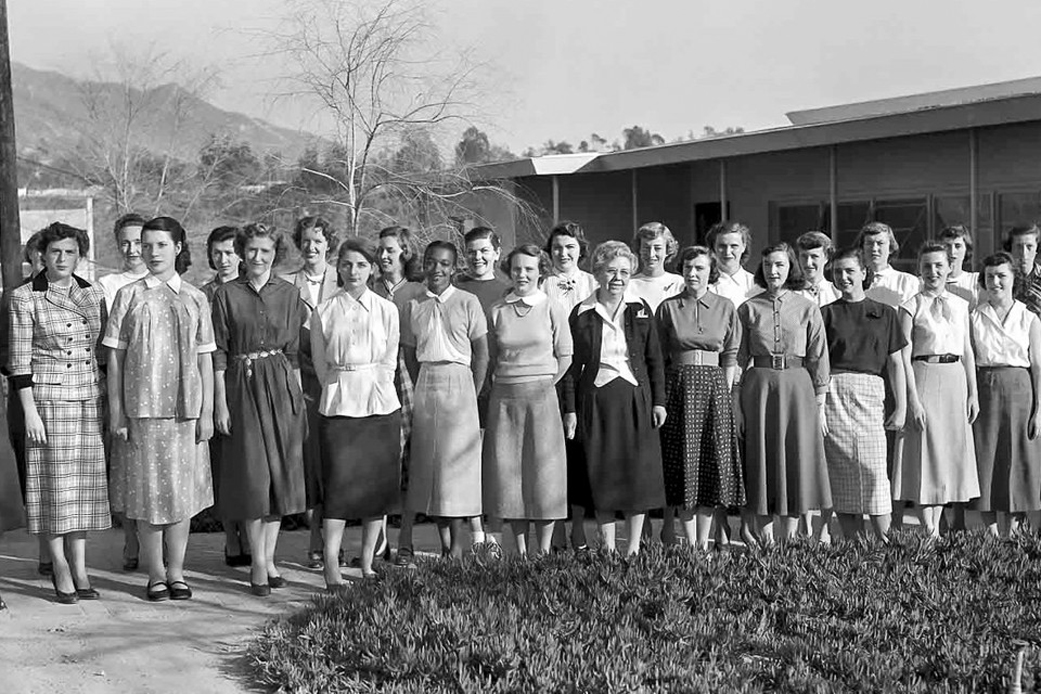
Jet Propulsion Laboratory computers (1953)

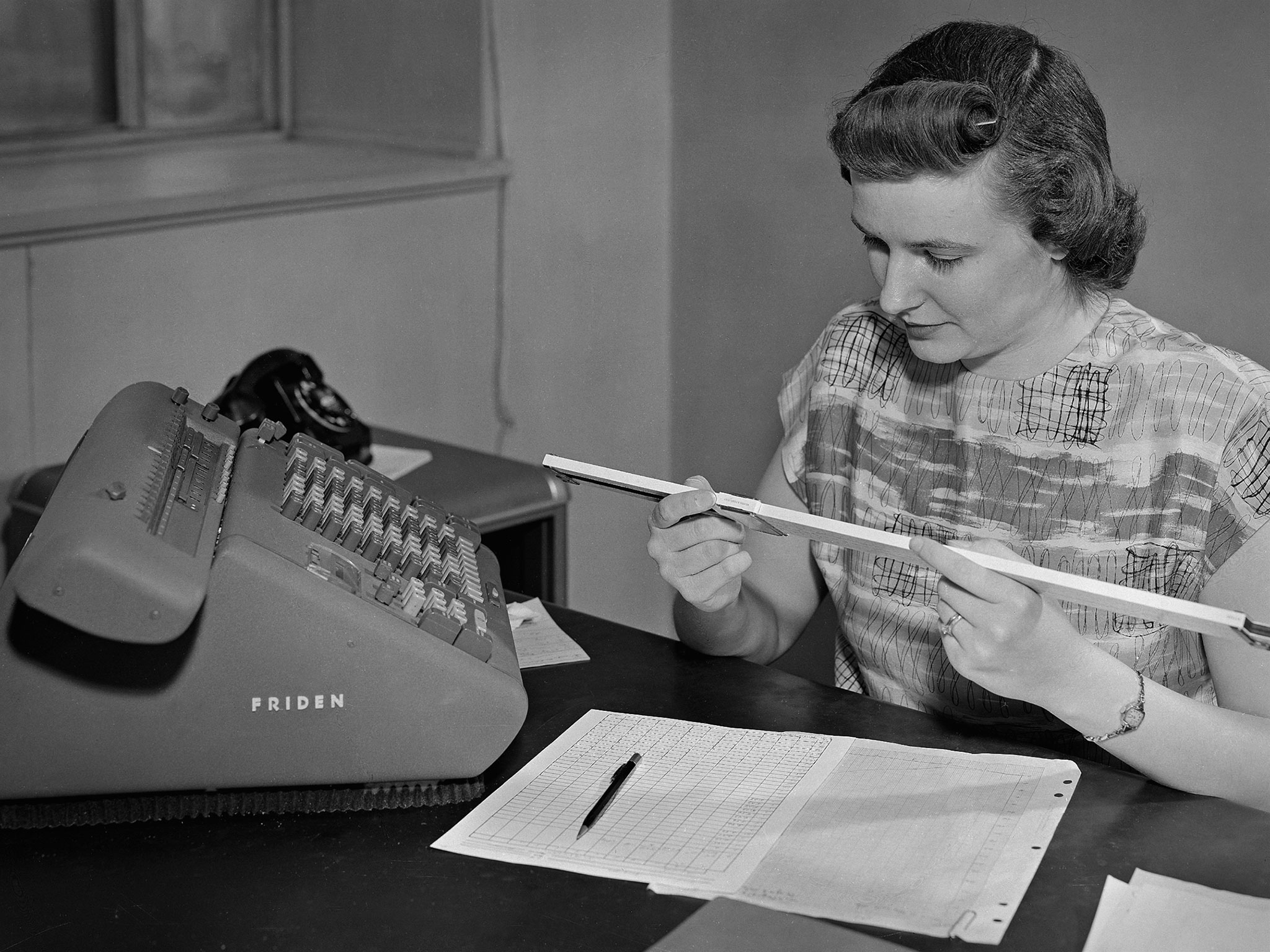
One of the hundred computers at work at the Lewis Flight Propulsion Laboratory in 1951, with her slide rule and adding machine

The Rocket Girls were the women that worked at NASA and the Jet Propulsion Laboratory (JPL) before the development of electronic computers. These women are mostly unknown, but they did the majority of all hand calculations for missions. Most of these women were called "computers" since they computed things.

== Notable women ==
- Barbara Paulson was one of the lead female computers hired by JPL.
- Macie Roberts was the supervisor of the female computers at JPL. She became the supervisor in the 1960s and continued her work for over thirty years.
- Helen Ling was a human computer supervisor at JPL. Ling followed in the footsteps of Macie Roberts as a supervisor for the female division of computers. She recruited and trained females that were proficient in mathematics and physics. Her legacy includes diversifying the female populus at JPL and continuing the excellence of female workers at NASA and JPL.
- Eleanor Frances discovered many meteors and comets while working at NASA.

== Sources mentioned in ==
The book Rocket Girl: The Story of Mary Sherman Morgan, America's First Female Rocket Scientist (2013) was written by George D. Morgan.

The book Rise of the Rocket Girls: The Women Who Propelled Us, from Missiles to the Moon to Mars (2016) was written by Nathalia Holt.

The book Hidden Figures: The American Dream and the Untold Story of the Black Women Who Helped Win the Space Race (2016) was written by Margot Lee Shetterly.

The movie Hidden Figures (2016) depicts the computers at NASA, including Katherine Johnson, Mary Jackson, and Dorothy Vaughan, and is loosely based on the book of the same name.
