= HIV latency =

Stage of HIV infection

Human Immunodeficiency Virus (HIV) has the capability to enter a latent stage of infection where it exists as a dormant provirus in CD4+ T-cells. Most latently infected cells are resting memory T cells, however a small fraction of latently infected cells isolated from HIV patients are naive CD4 T cells.

== Molecular Control of HIV Latency ==
HIV transcription is controlled by the 5' Long Terminal Repeat (LTR) region of the provirus, which serves as the key promoter.

=== LTR Structure ===
The LTR promoter has multiple upstream DNA regulatory elements: there are three SP1-binding sites, a TATA element, and an initiator sequence. The LTR has two NF-кB binding motifs that are capable of binding both NF-кB transcription factors as well as NFATs. The LTR promoter is very noisy and prone to large bursts of transcription. While signaling through the NF-кB enhancers has been shown to be necessary for re-activation of latent proviruses, mutations in these sites do not completely inhibit viral growth in cell line experiments.

=== Tat Control of HIV Transcription ===
The LTR of HIV is positively auto regulated by the Tat (transcription activator) protein, which is found towards the 3' end of the HIV genome. Without Tat activity, HIV transcription is restricted and often results in abortive transcripts. Tat activates the LTR through interactions with the elongation factor P-TEFb; Tat binds to cyclin T1, which is a unit of P-TEFb. Tat:P-TEFb directs RNA polymerases to the provirus genome by binding the HIV transactivation response (TAR) element, an RNA stem-loop structure.

== Latency Regulation ==
=== Cell-dependent control ===
In the cell-dependent model of latency regulation, host cell processes control provirus latency and induction. Generally, this model proposes that the relaxation of active CD4+ T-cells to a resting or quiescent state as memory T cells restricts proviral transcription and leads to latency.

Multiple host-cell processes have been experimentally linked to HIV latency regulation. Observations both in patient samples and in vitro experiments with T cell lines have correlated latency with the relaxation of activated T cells to a resting-memory state. Latency was initially thought to be due to HIV proviral genome integration into heterochromatin, but later it was found that latent proviral transcripts were still preferentially integrated into active genes. The main changes in cell state observed are epigenetic silencing of the HIV LTR as well as cytosolic sequestration of NF-кB and NFAST, which can activate HIV transcription if present in the nucleus. The LTRs of latent proviruses acquire heterochromatic structures instead of integrating into previously heterochromatic areas, and show high levels of deacetylated and methylated histones, which reinforces the role of chromatin restriction in latency regulation. Histone deacetylases (HDACs) are recruited to the proviral genome during latency establishment and methylate key Histone H3 Lysines, indicating a role of HDACs in latency regulation.

In addition to cytosolic sequestration of transcription factors, the P-TEFb complex is restricted in quiescent T cells through incorporation into an RNP complex. In latently infected cells, NF-кB induction and TNF-α have been shown to be necessary but not sufficient for viral induction. T-cell Receptor (TCR) activation has been shown to activate proviral transcription in latently-infected memory T cells, indicating some correlation between proviral induction and T cell state.

=== Cell-autonomous control ===
In contrast to the cell-dependent model, the cell-autonomous model proposes that HIV latency decisions are largely driven by the Tat-positive feedback loop and latency is therefore a probabilistic response due to intrinsically generated phenotypic heterogeneity rather than host-cell-determined.

Multiple studies have found that proviral induction is dependent on the Tat autoregulation response. In a study focused on understanding the diversity of roles of Sp1 and NF-кB binding elements in the LTR, authors noted that the Tat autoregulatory circuit resulted in a phenotypic bifurcation of genetically identical cells where viral gene expression was either off or highly induced. Additionally, primate studies of HIV latency have shown that latent cells emerge before the adaptive immune response is established, indicating that latency cannot entirely be dependent on T-cell relaxation after peak adaptive immune response. Latency is also established in cell-culture models with up to a 50% probability of establishment.

Some research has shown that the Tat positive-feedback loop in isolation has the ability to establish latency via stochastic noise, and that T-cell relaxation is not sufficient to drive latency. This model proposes to explain why many latent proviruses are not reactivated along with T-cell reactivation: instead of a deterministic mechanism, cellular activation or relaxation would probabilistically affect HIV latency decisions, which is consistent with other work showing that LTR regulatory sites have some influence on the frequency of phenotypic bifurcation of HIV transcription.

==== Bet-Hedging Hypothesis ====
One key hypothesis put forward is that latency allows HIV infection to persist past the initial mucosal stage; latently infected cells could allow HIV to disseminate from mucosal tissue to lymph nodes with much higher populations of the target CD4+ T cells. This hypothesis is supported by observations that HIV infections appear to expand from single founder sequences, indicating that the mucosal infection provides a bottleneck. A two-compartment model of HIV dissemination and transmission predicts that the probability of latency for an HIV provirus should be close to 50% to balance dissemination from the mucosal tissue and transmission inoculum.

== Clinical Relevance ==
Latently infected cells are the key barrier to viral elimination by current antiretroviral therapies. A study focused on determining the frequency of latently infected cells in patients on combination antiretroviral therapy found that latently infected cells created a stable reservoir of virus with a half-life of 43 months. This latent reservoir forces patients to continuously take antiretroviral therapy to avoid viral re-emergence. An additional study found that actively infected cells and viremia re-emerge within weeks of antiretroviral therapy being discontinued.

Some work has been put into a "shock and kill" strategy to circumvent the challenge posed by latently infected reservoirs: before antiretrovirals, there is a "shock" phase that attempts to reactivate most latent proviruses. So far, these "shock" phases focus on drugs that stimulate P-TEFb nuclear mobilization and direct transcriptional activation of HIV. Further work is being done to understand LTR noise and more effectively activate or kill latently infected cells.
