= Helen Ling =

Software engineer

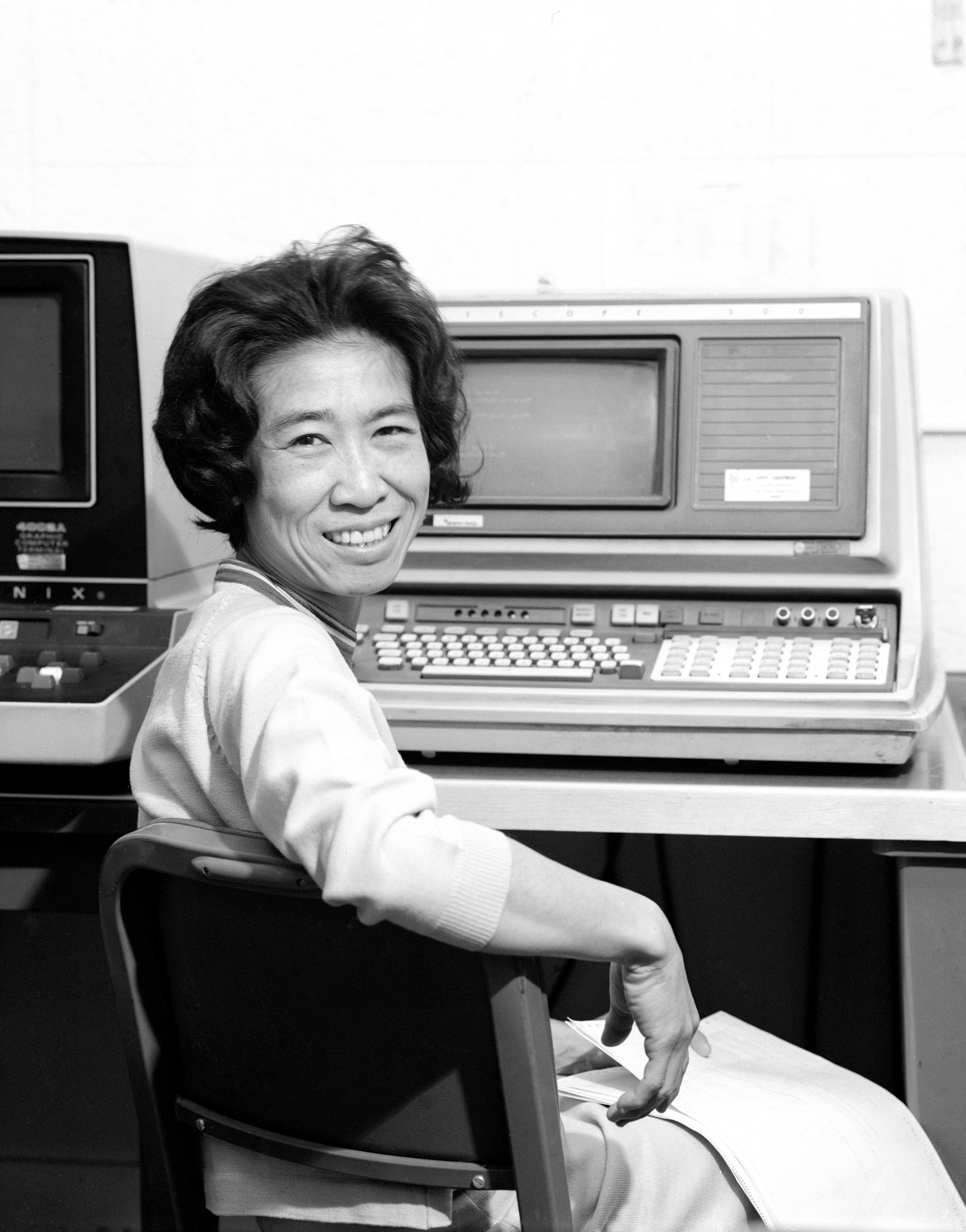
- Education: University of Notre Dame
- Employer: Jet Propulsion Laboratory

Helen Ling (née Yee Chow, born October 1, 1928) is a former software engineer who worked at NASA's Jet Propulsion Laboratory (JPL). She made considerable efforts to make JPL more diverse.

== Early life ==
Ling was born in Canton, China and survived the Japanese bombing of Hong Kong. She studied at Canton College. She immigrated to the United States to attend college, and ended up studying at University of Notre Dame. She majored in art and minored in Mathematics. Shortly after graduation, she was hired at JPL.

== Career ==
Ling's brother worked at JPL, and she thought the job would be perfect for her. Ling was a supervisor for the computing group at JPL. She made efforts to employ women computer programmers during the late 1950s and early 1960s - the programming group used to call themselves "Helen's Girls". Ling's group were responsible for performing trajectory calculations. Ling encouraged women to attend night school and obtain the correct qualifications to work alongside her at JPL. At the time, women at JPL were forced to quit if they became pregnant. Instead of losing her talented team, Ling rehired women returning from maternity leave. The author Nathalia Holt believes that "a lot of women ended up becoming computer scientists and engineers at JPL thanks to Helen's guidance". Her high school crush, Canton College's student body president Arthur Ling, immigrated to America and married Ling. Ling developed software for the IRAS, Magellan, the TOPEX/Poseidon spacecraft and Mars Observer. She retired from JPL in 1994.

Ling developed software for many missions over the years, including the Infrared Astronomical Satellite, Magellan, Mars Observer and Topex/Poseidon. Her work was respected by Charley Kohlhase, the Voyager mission designer, who didn't want anyone else to develop his software. Ling retired in 1994 but still keeps in touch with her former colleagues. She lives in South Pasadena, Calif., with her husband Art.

Ling is referenced in the book Rise of the Rocket Girls by Nathalia Holt, a biologist and science writer. The "rocket girls" worked outside of the home when only 20 percent of women did so.

== Quotes ==
"Men back then always thought they knew more than you did," Ling remembers. "So if you hire them under you, they're uncomfortable, you're uncomfortable. So I just hired women just out of college. I thought that if you didn't give them a chance, they'll never get a chance."
