= Innate resistance to HIV =

A small proportion of humans show partial or apparently complete innate resistance to HIV, the virus that causes AIDS. The main mechanism is a mutation of the gene encoding CCR5, which acts as a co-receptor for HIV. It is estimated that the proportion of people with some form of resistance to HIV is under 10%.

== History ==
In 1994, Stephen Crohn became the first person discovered to be completely resistant to HIV in all tests performed despite having partners infected by the virus. Crohn's resistance was a result of the absence of a receptor, which prevent the HIV from infecting CD4 present on the exterior of the white blood cells. The absence of such receptors, or rather the shortening of them to the point of being inoperable, is known as the delta 32 mutation. This mutation is linked to groups of people that have been exposed to HIV but remain uninfected such as some offspring of HIV positive mothers, health officials, and sex workers.

In early 2000, researchers discovered a small group of sex workers in Nairobi, Kenya, who were estimated to have sexual contact with 60 to 70 HIV positive clients a year without signs of infection. These sex workers were not found to have the delta mutation leading scientists to believe other factors could create a genetic resistance to HIV. Researchers from Public Health Agency of Canada have identified 15 proteins unique to those virus-free sex workers. Later, however, some sex workers were discovered to have contracted the virus, leading Oxford University researcher Sarah Rowland-Jones to believe continual exposure is a requirement for maintaining immunity.

== CCR5 deletion ==
C-C chemokine receptor type 5, also known as CCR5 or CD195, is a protein on the surface of white blood cells that is involved in the immune system as it acts as a receptor for chemokines. This is the process by which T cells are attracted to specific tissue and organ targets. Many strains of HIV use CCR5 as a co-receptor to enter and infect host cells. A few individuals carry a mutation known as CCR5-Δ32 in the CCR5 gene, protecting them against these strains of HIV.

In humans, the CCR5 gene that encodes the CCR5 protein is located on the short (p) arm at position 21 on chromosome 3. A cohort study, from June 1981 to October 2016, looked into the correlation between the delta 32 deletion and HIV resistance, and found that homozygous carriers of the delta 32 mutation are resistant to M-tropic strains of HIV-1 infection. Certain populations have inherited the Delta 32 mutation resulting in the genetic deletion of a portion of the CCR5 gene.

== TNPO3 mutation ==
In 2019, it was discovered that a mutation of TNPO3 that causes type 1F limb-girdle muscular dystrophy (LGMD1F) also causes innate resistance to HIV-1. TNP03 was known to be involved into virus transportation into the infected cells. Blood samples from a family affected by LGMD1F showed a resistance to HIV infection. While the CCR5Δ32 deletion blocks the entry of virus strains that use the CCR5 receptor, the TNPO3 mutation causing LGMD1F blocks the CXCR4 receptor, making it effective on different HIV-1 strains, due to HIV tropism.

== Cytotoxic T-lymphocytes ==
Cytotoxic T-lymphocytes (CTLs) provide a protective reaction against HIV when consistent exposure to the virus is present. The Nairobi sex workers were found to have these CTLs within genital mucus, preventing the spread of HIV within heterosexual transmission. While creating a protective seal, CTLs become ineffective when lapses in HIV exposure occur, which leads to the possibility of CTLs only being an indicator of other genetic resistances towards HIV, such as immunoglobulin A responses within vaginal fluids.

=== African non-human primates ===
Chimpanzees in African countries have been found to develop AIDS at a slower rate than humans. This resistance is not due to the primate's ability to control the virus in a manner that is substantially more effective than humans, but rather because of the lack of tissues created within the body that typically progress HIV to AIDS. The chimpanzees also lack CD4 T cells and immune activation that is required for the spread of HIV.

== Creating genetic resistance ==
While antiretroviral therapy (ART) has slowed the progression of HIV among patients, gene therapy through stem cell research gave resistance to HIV. One method of genetic modification is through the manipulation of hematopoietic stem cells, which replaces HIV genes with engineered particles that attach to chromosomes. Peptides are formed that prevent HIV from fusing to the host cells and therefore stops the infection from spreading. Another method used by the Kiem lab was the release of zinc finger nuclease (ZFN), which identifies specific sections of DNA to cause a break in the double helix. These ZFNs were used to target CCR5 in order to delete the protein, halting the course of the infection.

Alternatively to gene therapy, medication such as maraviroc (MVC) is being used to bind with CCR5 particles, blocking the entry of HIV into the cell. While not effective with all types, MVC has been proven to decrease the spread of HIV through monotherapy as well as combination therapy with ARTs. MVC is the only CCR5 binding drug approved for use by the Food and Drug Administration, the European Commission and Health Canada.

== HIV resistance as an environmental factor ==
While the delta mutation has been observed to prevent HIV in specific populations, it has shown little to no effect between healthy individuals and those who are infected with HIV among Iranian populations. This is attributed to individuals being heterozygous for the mutation, which prevents the delta mutation from effectively prohibiting HIV from entering immune cells.

== See also ==
- Discovery and development of CCR5 receptor antagonists
- Entry inhibitor
- HIV tropism
- Timothy Ray Brown
- Stephen Crohn
