= CCR5-Δ32 =

Gene variant

CCR5-Δ32 (or CCR5-D32 or CCR5 delta 32) is a genetic variant of the CCR5 gene characterized by a 32-base-pair deletion that produces a nonfunctional receptor on the surface of immune cells, conferring strong resistance to HIV-1 infection in individuals who inherit two copies of the mutation (homozygotes).

CCR5 Δ32 is a 32-base-pair deletion that introduces a premature stop codon into the CCR5 receptor locus, resulting in a nonfunctional receptor. CCR5 is required for M-tropic HIV-1 virus entry. Individuals homozygous (denoted Δ32/Δ32) for CCR5 Δ32 do not express functional CCR5 receptors on their cell surfaces and are resistant to HIV-1 infection, despite multiple high-risk exposures. Individuals heterozygous (+/Δ32) for the mutant allele have a greater than 50% reduction in functional CCR5 receptors on their cell surfaces due to dimerization between mutant and wild-type receptors that interferes with transport of CCR5 to the cell surface. Heterozygote carriers are resistant to HIV-1 infection relative to wild types and when infected, heterozygotes exhibit reduced viral loads and a 2-3-year-slower progression to AIDS relative to wild types. Heterozygosity for this mutant allele also has shown to improve one's virological response to anti-retroviral treatment. CCR5 Δ32 has a heterozygote frequency of 9% in Europe, and a homozygote frequency of 1%.

Recent research indicates that CCR5 Δ32 enhances cognition and memory. In 2016, researchers showed that removing the CCR5 gene from mice significantly improved their memory. CCR5 is a powerful suppressor for neuronal plasticity, learning, and memory; CCR5 over-activation by viral proteins may contribute to HIV-associated cognitive deficits.

== HIV ==
Human Immunodeficiency virus uses CCR5 receptor to target and infect host T-cells in humans. It weakens the immune system by destroying the CD4+ T-helper cells, making the body more susceptible to other infections. CCR5-Δ32 is an allelic variant of CCR5 gene with a 32 base pair deletion that results in a truncated receptor. People with this allele are resistant to AIDS as HIV cannot bind to the non-functional CCR5 receptor. An unusually high frequency of this allele is found in European Caucasian population, with an observed cline towards the north. Most researchers have attributed the current frequency of this allele to two major epidemics of human history: plague and smallpox. Although this allele originated much earlier, its frequency rose dramatically about 700 years ago. This led scientists to believe that bubonic plague acted as a selective pressure that drove CCR5-Δ32 to high frequency. It was speculated that allele may have provided protection against the Yersinia pestis, which is the causative agent for plague. Many in vivo mouse studies have refuted this claim by showing no protective effects of CCR5-Δ32 allele in mice infected with Y. pestis. Another theory that has gained more scientific support links the current frequency of the allele to smallpox epidemic. Although plague has killed a greater number people in a given time period, smallpox has collectively taken more lives. As smallpox has been dated back to 2000 years, a longer time period would have given smallpox enough time to exert selective pressure given an earlier origin of CCR5-Δ32. Population genetic models that analyzed geographic and temporal distribution of both plague and smallpox provide a much stronger evidence for smallpox as the driving factor of CCR5-Δ32. Smallpox has a higher mortality rate than plague, and it mostly affects children under the age of ten. From an evolutionary viewpoint, this results in greater loss of reproductive potential from a population which may explain increased selective pressure by smallpox. Smallpox was more prevalent in regions where higher CCR5-Δ32 frequencies are seen. Myxoma and variola major belong to the same family of viruses and myxoma has been shown to use CCR5 receptor to enter its host. Moreover, Yersinia is a bacterium which is biologically distinct from viruses and is unlikely to have similar mechanism of transmission. Recent evidence provides a strong support for smallpox as the selective agent for CCR5-Δ32.

== Haplotype and architecture ==
Genetic studies published in 2025 revealed that the CCR5Δ32 deletion is part of a specific haplotype, termed Haplotype A, which includes 86 linked variants in high linkage disequilibrium (LD). Within this haplotype, two single nucleotide polymorphisms (SNPs), rs113341849 and rs113010081, are in perfect LD (r² = 1) with CCR5Δ32 and thus statistically indistinguishable in genotype data. This haplotype is located on chromosome 3 (3p21.31), spans approximately 0.19 megabases, and encompasses several chemokine receptor genes, including CCR3, CCR2, CCR5, and CCRL2. Although two additional haplotypes, B and C, were identified in the region, only Haplotype A carries the CCR5Δ32 deletion. The configuration of the three haplotypes—A, B, and C—was illustrated in Figure 1A of the study.

== Evolutionary history ==
The CCR5 Δ32 allele is notable for its recent origin, unexpectedly high frequency, and distinct geographic distribution, which together suggest that (a) it arose from a single mutation, and (b) it was historically subject to positive selection.

Two studies have used linkage analysis to estimate the age of the CCR5 Δ32 deletion, assuming that the amount of recombination and mutation observed on genomic regions surrounding the CCR5 Δ32 deletion would be proportional to the age of the deletion. Using a sample of 4000 individuals from 38 ethnic populations, Stephens et al. estimated that the CCR5-Δ32 deletion occurred 700 years ago (275–1875, 95% confidence interval). Another group, Libert et al. (1998), used microsatellite mutations to estimate the age of the CCR5 Δ32 mutation to be 2100 years (700–4800, 95% confidence interval). On the basis of observed recombination events, they estimated the age of the mutation to be 2250 years (900–4700, 95% confidence interval). A third hypothesis relies on the north-to-south gradient of allele frequency in Europe, which shows that the highest allele frequency occurred in the Nordic countries and lowest allele frequency in southern Europe. Because the Vikings historically occupied these countries, it may be possible that the allele spread throughout Europe due to the Viking dispersal in the 8th to 10th centuries. Vikings were later replaced by the Varangians in Russia, which may have contributed to the observed east-to-west cline of allele frequency.

HIV-1 was initially transmitted from chimpanzees (Pan troglodytes) to humans in the early 1900s in Southeast Cameroon, Africa, through exposure to infected blood and body fluids while butchering bushmeat. However, HIV-1 was effectively absent from Europe until the 1980s. Therefore, given the average age of roughly 1000 years for the CCR5-Δ32 allele, it can be established that HIV-1 did not exert selection pressure on the human population for long enough to achieve the current frequencies. Hence, other pathogens have been suggested as agents of positive selection for CCR5 Δ32, including bubonic plague (Yersinia pestis) and smallpox (Variola major). Other data suggest that the allele frequency experienced negative selection pressure as a result of pathogens that became more widespread during Roman expansion. The idea that negative selection played a role in the allele's low frequency is also supported by experiments using knockout mice and Influenza A, which demonstrated that the presence of the CCR5 receptor is important for efficient response to a pathogen.

== Evidence for a single mutation ==
Several lines of evidence suggest that the CCR5 Δ32 allele evolved only once. First, CCR5 Δ32 has a relatively high frequency in several different European populations but is comparatively absent in Asian, Middle Eastern and American Indian populations, suggesting that a single mutation occurred after divergence of Europeans from their African ancestor. Second, genetic linkage analysis indicates that the mutation occurs on a homogeneous genetic background, implying that inheritance of the mutation occurred from a common ancestor. This was demonstrated by showing that the CCR5 Δ32 allele is in strong linkage disequilibrium with highly polymorphic microsatellites. More than 95% of CCR5 Δ32 chromosomes also carried the IRI3.1-0 allele, while 88% carried the IRI3.2 allele. By contrast, the microsatellite markers IRI3.1-0 and IRI3.2-0 were found in only 2 or 1.5% of chromosomes carrying a wild-type CCR5 allele. This evidence of linkage disequilibrium supports the hypothesis that most, if not all, CCR5 Δ32 alleles arose from a single mutational event. Finally, the CCR5 Δ32 allele has a unique geographical distribution indicating a single Northern origin followed by migration. A study measuring allele frequencies in 18 European populations found a North-to-South gradient, with the highest allele frequencies in Finnish and Mordvinian populations (16%), and the lowest in Sardinia (4%).

== Positive selection ==
In the absence of selection, a single mutation would take an estimated 127,500 years to rise to a population frequency of 10%. Estimates based on genetic recombination and mutation rates place the age of the allele between 1000 and 2000 years. This discrepancy is a signature of positive selection.

It is estimated that HIV-1 entered the human population in Africa in the early 1900s, but symptomatic infections were not reported until the 1980s. The HIV-1 epidemic is therefore far too young to be the source of positive selection that drove the frequency of CCR5 Δ32 from zero to 10% in 2000 years.

=== Protection from bubonic plague ===
Stephens, et al. (1998), suggest that bubonic plague (Yersinia pestis) had exerted positive selective pressure on CCR5 Δ32. This hypothesis was based on the timing and severity of the Black Death pandemic, which killed 30% of the European population of all ages between 1346 and 1352. After the Black Death, there were less severe, intermittent epidemics. Individual cities experienced high mortality, but overall mortality in Europe was only a few percent. In 1655-1656 a second pandemic called the "Great Plague" killed 15-20% of London's population. Importantly, the plague epidemics were intermittent. Bubonic plague is a zoonotic disease, primarily infecting rodents, spread by fleas, and only occasionally infecting humans. Human-to-human infection of bubonic plague does not occur, though it can occur in pneumonic plague, which infects the lungs. Only when the density of rodents is low are infected fleas forced to feed on alternative hosts such as humans, and under these circumstances a human epidemic may occur. Based on population genetic models, Galvani and Slatkin (2003) argue that the intermittent nature of plague epidemics did not generate a sufficiently strong selective force to drive the allele frequency of CCR5 Δ32 to 10% in Europe. To test this hypothesis, Galvani and Slatkin (2003) modeled the historical selection pressures produced by plague and smallpox.

=== Protection from smallpox ===
Plague was modeled according to historical accounts, while age-specific smallpox mortality was gleaned from the age distribution of smallpox burials in York (England) between 1770 and 1812. Smallpox preferentially infects young, pre-reproductive members of the population since they are the only individuals who are not immunized or dead from past infection. Because smallpox preferentially kills pre-reproductive members of a population, it generates stronger selective pressure than plague. Unlike plague, smallpox does not have an animal reservoir and is only transmitted from human to human. The authors calculated that if plague were selecting for CCR5 Δ32, the frequency of the allele would still be less than 1%, while smallpox has exerted a selective force sufficient to reach 10%.

The hypothesis that smallpox exerted positive selection for CCR5 Δ32 is also biologically plausible, since poxviruses, like HIV, enter white blood cells using chemokine receptors. By contrast, Yersinia pestis is a bacterium with a very different biology.

Although Europeans are the only group to have subpopulations with a high frequency of CCR5 Δ32, they are not the only population that has been subject to selection by smallpox, which had a worldwide distribution before it was declared eradicated in 1980. The earliest unmistakable descriptions of smallpox appear in the 5th century A.D. in China, the 7th century A.D. in India and the Mediterranean, and the 10th century A.D. in southwestern Asia. By contrast, the CCR5 Δ32 mutation is found only in European, West Asian, and North African populations. The anomalously high frequency of CCR5 Δ32 in these populations appears to require both a unique origin in Northern Europe and subsequent selection by smallpox.

== Potential costs ==
CCR5 Δ32 can be beneficial to the host in some infections (e.g., HIV-1, possibly smallpox), but detrimental in others (e.g., tick-borne encephalitis, West Nile virus). Whether CCR5 function is helpful or harmful in the context of a given infection depends on a complex interplay between the immune system and the pathogen.

In general, research suggests that the CCR5 Δ32 mutation may play a deleterious role in post-infection inflammatory processes, which can injure tissue and create further pathology. The best evidence for this proposed antagonistic pleiotropy is found in flavivirus infections. In general many viral infections are asymptomatic or produce only mild symptoms in the vast majority of the population. However, certain unlucky individuals experience a particularly destructive clinical course, which is otherwise unexplained but appears to be genetically mediated. Patients homozygous for CCR5 Δ32 were found to be at higher risk for a neuroinvasive form of tick-borne encephalitis (caused by a flavivirus). In addition, functional CCR5 may be required to prevent symptomatic disease after infection with West Nile virus, another flavivirus; CCR5 Δ32 was associated with early symptom development and more pronounced clinical manifestations after infection with West Nile virus.

This finding in humans confirmed a previously observed experiment in an animal model of CCR5 Δ32 homozygosity. After infection with West Nile virus, CCR5 Δ32 mice had markedly increased viral titers in the central nervous system and had increased mortality compared with that of wild-type mice, thus suggesting that CCR5 expression was necessary to mount a strong host defense against West Nile virus.

== Medical applications ==
A genetic approach involving intrabodies that block CCR5 expression has been proposed as a treatment for HIV-1 infected individuals. When T-cells modified so they no longer express CCR5 were mixed with unmodified T-cells expressing CCR5 and then challenged by infection with HIV-1, the modified T-cells that do not express CCR5 eventually take over the culture, as HIV-1 kills the non-modified T-cells. This same method might be used in vivo to establish a virus-resistant cell pool in infected individuals.

This hypothesis was tested in an AIDS patient who had also developed myeloid leukemia, and was treated with chemotherapy to suppress the cancer. A bone marrow transplant containing stem cells from a matched donor was then used to restore the immune system. However, the transplant was performed from a donor with 2 copies of CCR5-Δ32 mutation gene. After 600 days, the patient was healthy and had undetectable levels of HIV in the blood and in examined brain and rectal tissues. Before the transplant, low levels of HIV X4, which does not use the CCR5 receptor, were also detected. Following the transplant, however, this type of HIV was not detected either. However, this outcome is consistent with the observation that cells expressing the CCR5-Δ32 variant protein lack both the CCR5 and CXCR4 receptors on their surfaces, thereby conferring resistance to a broad range of HIV variants including HIVX4. After over six years, the patient has maintained the resistance to HIV and has been pronounced cured of the HIV infection.

Enrollment of HIV-positive patients in a clinical trial was started in 2009 in which the patients' cells were genetically modified with a zinc finger nuclease to carry the CCR5-Δ32 trait and then reintroduced into the body as a potential HIV treatment. Results reported in 2014 were promising.

Inspired by the first person to be cured of HIV, The Berlin Patient, StemCyte began collaborations with cord blood banks worldwide to systematically screen umbilical cord blood samples for the CCR5 mutation beginning in 2011.

In November 2018, Jiankui He announced that he had edited two human embryos, to attempt to disable the gene for CCR5, which codes for a receptor that HIV uses to enter cells. He said that twin girls, Lulu and Nana, had been born a few weeks earlier, and that the girls still carried functional copies of CCR5 along with disabled CCR5 (mosaicism), hence being still vulnerable to HIV. The work was widely condemned as unethical, dangerous, and premature.
