= Cenicriviroc =

Names
- Preferred IUPAC name (5E)-8-[4-(2-Butoxyethoxy)phenyl]-1-(2-methylpropyl)-N-{4-[(S)-(1-propyl-1H-imidazol-5-yl)methanesulfinyl]phenyl}-1,2,3,4-tetrahydro-1-benzazocine-5-carboxamide
- Other names TAK-652; TBR-652

Identifiers
CAS Number	497223-25-3; 497223-28-6 (mesylate)
3D model (JSmol)	Interactive image
ChEBI	CHEBI:149636
ChEMBL	ChEMBL2110727
ChemSpider	9460783
IUPHAR/BPS	801
KEGG	D09878
PubChem CID	11285792; 11285792
UNII	15C116UA4Y; R96TV84T21 (mesylate)
CompTox Dashboard (EPA)	DTXSID80964373
- InChI: InChI=1S/C41H52N4O4S/c1-5-7-22-48-23-24-49-38-15-10-32(11-16-38)33-12-19-40-35(25-33)26-34(9-8-21-44(40)28-31(3)4)41(46)43-36-13-17-39(18-14-36)50(47)29-37-27-42-30-45(37)20-6-2/h10-19,25-27,30-31H,5-9,20-24,28-29H2,1-4H3,(H,43,46)/b34-26+/t50-/m0/s1 Key: PNDKCRDVVKJPKG-WHERJAGFSA-N; InChI=1/C41H52N4O4S/c1-5-7-22-48-23-24-49-38-15-10-32(11-16-38)33-12-19-40-35(25-33)26-34(9-8-21-44(40)28-31(3)4)41(46)43-36-13-17-39(18-14-36)50(47)29-37-27-42-30-45(37)20-6-2/h10-19,25-27,30-31H,5-9,20-24,28-29H2,1-4H3,(H,43,46)/b34-26+/t50-/m0/s1 Key: PNDKCRDVVKJPKG-WHERJAGFBH
- SMILES: O=S(c1ccc(cc1)NC(=O)\C4=C\c3c(ccc(c2ccc(OCCOCCCC)cc2)c3)N(CCC4)CC(C)C)Cc5cncn5CCC

Properties
Chemical formula	C_{41}H_{52}N_{4}O_{4}S
Molar mass	696.95 g·mol^{−1}
- Except where otherwise noted, data are given for materials in their standard state (at 25 °C [77 °F], 100 kPa). verify (what is ?) Infobox references

Cenicriviroc (INN, code names TAK-652, TBR-652, commonly abbreviated as CVC) is an experimental drug candidate for the treatment of HIV infection and in combination with Tropifexor for non-alcoholic steatohepatitis. It is being developed by Takeda and Tobira Therapeutics.

Cenicriviroc is an inhibitor of CCR2 and CCR5 receptors, allowing it to function as an entry inhibitor which prevents the virus from entering into a human cell. Inhibition of CCR2 may have an anti-inflammatory effect.

A double-blind, randomized, placebo-controlled clinical study to assess the antiviral activity, safety, and tolerability of cenicriviroc was conducted in 2010. HIV-infected patients taking cenicriviroc had significant reductions in viral load, with the effect persisting up to two weeks after discontinuation of treatment. Additional Phase II clinical trials are underway.

Cenicriviroc is also in two separate clinical trials for COVID-19: the ACTIV-I trial run by the National Center for Advancing Translational Sciences, where it is compared with a number of other immunomodulatory agents, and the Charité Trial of Cenicriviroc at the Charité Hospital in Berlin. As of 2 July 2021, both trials are recruiting participants, and are expected to complete in September 2021.

Phase IIb data presented at the 20th Conference on Retroviruses and Opportunistic Infections (CROI) in March 2013 showed similar viral suppression rates of 76% for patients taking 100 mg cenicriviroc, 73% with 200 mg cenicriviroc, and 71% with efavirenz. Non-response rates were higher with cenicriviroc, however, largely due to greater drop-out of patients. A new tablet formulation with lower pill burden may improve adherence. Looking at immune and inflammatory biomarkers, levels of MCP-1 increased and soluble CD14 decreased in the cenicriviroc arms.

== See also ==
- Discovery and development of CCR5-receptor antagonists
- Maraviroc
- Vicriviroc
