= Discovery and development of nucleoside and nucleotide reverse-transcriptase inhibitors =

Discovery and development of nucleoside and nucleotide reverse-transcriptase inhibitors (NRTIs and NtRTIs) began in the 1980s when the AIDS epidemic hit Western societies. NRTIs inhibit the reverse transcriptase (RT), an enzyme that controls the replication of the genetic material of the human immunodeficiency virus (HIV). The first NRTI was zidovudine, approved by the U.S. Food and Drug Administration (FDA) in 1987, which was the first step towards treatment of HIV. Six NRTI agents and one NtRTI have followed. The NRTIs and the NtRTI are analogues of endogenous 2´-deoxy-nucleoside and nucleotide. Drug-resistant viruses are an inevitable consequence of prolonged exposure of HIV-1 to anti-HIV drugs.

== History ==
In the summer of 1981 the acquired immunodeficiency syndrome (AIDS) was first reported. Two years later the etiological link to AIDS, the human immunodeficiency virus (HIV) was identified. Since the identification of HIV the development of effective antiretroviral drugs and the scientific achievements in HIV research has been enormous. Antiretroviral drugs for the treatment of HIV infections belong to six categories: Nucleoside and nucleotide reverse-transcriptase inhibitors, Non-nucleoside reverse-transcriptase inhibitors, protease inhibitors, entry inhibitors, co-receptor inhibitors and integrase inhibitors. The reverse transcriptase of HIV-1 has been the main foundation for the development of anti-HIV drugs. The first nucleoside reverse-transcriptase inhibitor with in vitro anti-HIV activity was zidovudine. Since zidovudine was approved in 1987, six nucleosides and one nucleotide reverse-transcriptase inhibitor (NRTI) have been approved by FDA. NRTIs approved by the FDA are zidovudine, didanosine, zalcitabine, stavudine, lamivudine, abacavir and emtricitabine and the only nucleotide reverse-transcriptase inhibitor (NtRTI) approved is tenofovir (see table 4).

== The HIV-1 reverse transcriptase enzyme ==
=== Function ===
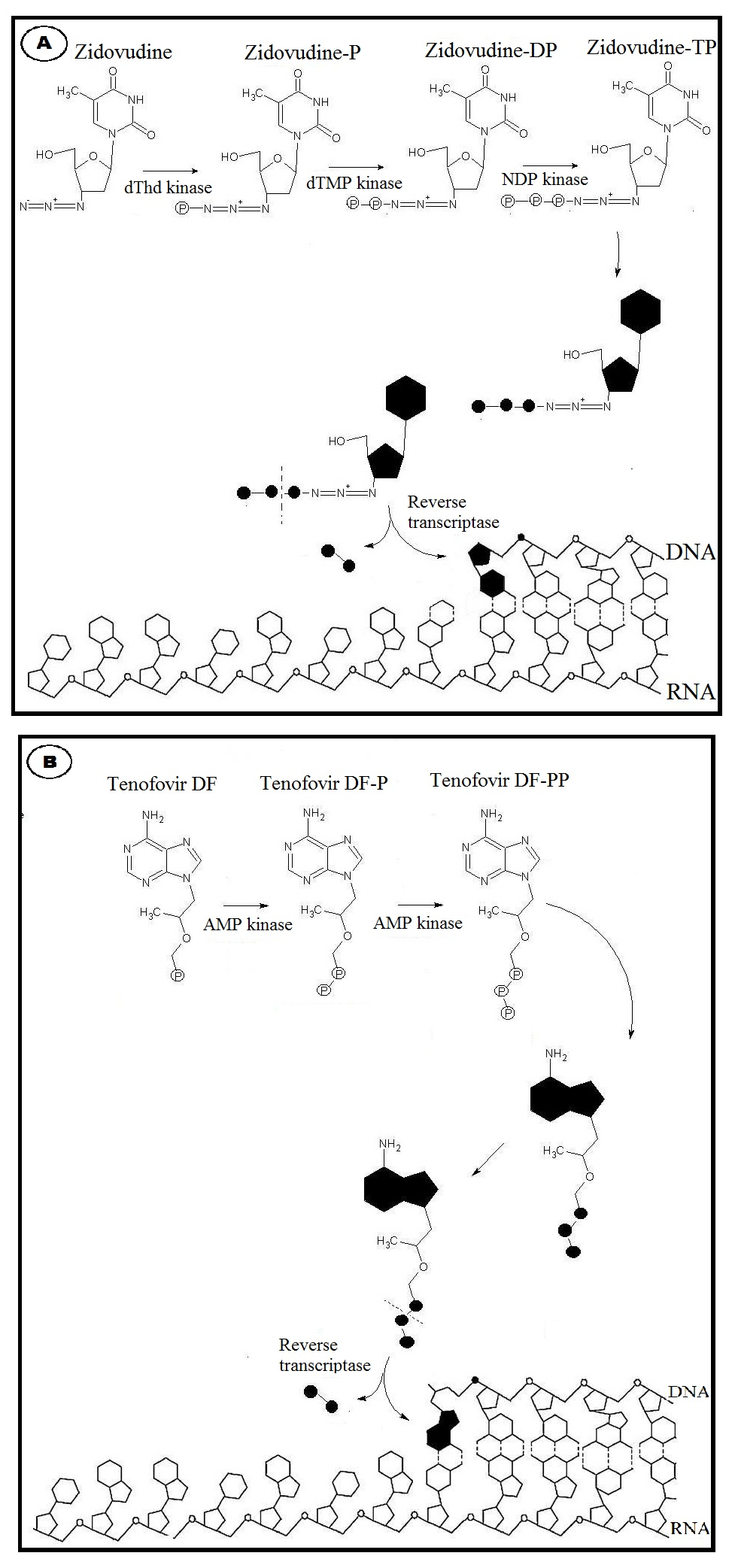
Figure 1 A: Mechanism of action of nucleoside analogues reverse transcriptase inhibitors, for example zidovudine. B: Mechanism of action of the nucleotide analogue reverse-transcriptase inhibitor, tenofovir

Most standard HIV drug therapies revolve around inhibiting the reverse transcriptase enzyme (RT), an enzyme that is necessary to the HIV-1 virus and other retroviruses to complete their life cycle. The RT enzyme serves two key functions. First, it controls the replication of the viruses genetic material via its polymerase activity. It converts the viral single-stranded RNA into an integration competent double stranded DNA. Subsequently, the generated DNA is translocated into the nucleus of the host cell where it is integrated in its genome by the retroviral integrase. The other role of the RT is its ribonuclease H activity that degrades RNA only when it is in a heteroduplex with DNA.

=== Structure ===
HIV-1 RT is an asymmetric heterodimer which is 1000 amino acid long and is composed of two subunits. The larger subunit, p66, is 560 amino acid long and it exhibits all the enzymatic activities of the RT. The smaller subunit, called p51, is 440 amino acid long and it is considered to stabilize the heterodimer but also it may take part in the binding of the tRNA primer. The p66 subunit has the two active sites: polymerase and ribonuclease H. The polymerase has four subdomains that have been named “fingers“, “thumb“, “connection“ and “palm“ for it has been compared to the right hand.

== Mechanism of action ==
Activation of nucleoside and nucleotide reverse-transcriptase inhibitors is primarily dependent on cellular entry by passive diffusion or carrier-mediated transport. NRTIs are highly hydrophilic and have limited membrane permeability and therefore this step is very important. NRTIs are analogues of endogenous 2´-deoxy-nucleoside and nucleotide. They are inactive in their parent forms and require successive phosphorylation.

Nucleosides must be triphosphorylated, while nucleotides, which possess one phosphonated group, must be diphosphorylated. This stepwise activation process occurs inside the cell and is mediated by a coordinated series of enzymes. The first, and often rate limiting, phosphorylation step (for nucleoside analogues) are most commonly catalyzed by deoxynucleoside kinases. Addition of the second phosphate group to nucleoside monophosphate analogues is completed by the nucleoside monophosphate kinases (NMP kinases). A variety of enzymes are able to catalyze the final phosphorylation step for NRTIs, including nucleoside diphosphate kinase (NDP kinase), phosphoglycerate kinase, pyruvate kinase and creatine kinase, resulting in formation of respective antivirally active triphosphate analogues. In their respective triphosphate forms, NRTIs and the only NtRTI available compete with their corresponding endogenous deoxynucleotide triphosphate (dNTPs) for incorporation into the nascent DNA chain (see figure 1). Unlike dNTPs substrate, NRTIs lack a 3´-hydroxyl group on the deoxyribose moiety. Once incorporated into the DNA chain, the absence of a 3´-hydroxyl group, which normally forms the 5´- to 3´- phosphoester bond with the next nucleic acid, blocks further extension of the DNA by RT, and they act as chain terminators.

== Discovery and development ==
=== First step towards treatment of HIV- zidovudine ===
In 1964 zidovudine (AZT) was synthesized by Horwitz at the Michigan Cancer Foundation. The 3´hydroxyl group in the deoxyribose ring of thymidine is replaced by an azido group which gives us zidovudine. The lack of the 3´hydroxyl group which provides the attachment point for the next nucleotide in the growing DNA chain during the reverse transcription makes it an obligate chain terminator. Ziduvodine is incorporated in place of thymidine and is an extremely potent inhibitor of HIV replication. This compound had been prepared in 1964 as a potential anti-cancer agent but was shown to be ineffective. In 1974 zidovudine was reported to have activity against retroviruses and was subsequently re-screened as an antiviral when the AIDS epidemic hit Western societies during the mid-1980s. However, zidovudine is relatively toxic since it is converted into the triphosphate by the cellular enzymes and therefore it is activated in uninfected cells.

=== Further development of nucleoside analogues ===
==== Dideoxynucleosides ====
Table 1 Comparison of chemical structures: Dideoxyadenosine and didanosine
Chemical

structure

Dideoxyadenosine
Didanosine

Dideoxynucleosides are analogues of nucleoside where the sugar ring lacks both 2´ and 3´-hydroxyl groups. Three years after the synthesis of zidovudine, Jerome Horwitz and his colleagues in Chicago prepared another dideoxynucleoside now known as zalcitabine (ddC). Zalcitabine is a synthetic pyrimidine nucleoside analogue, structurally related to deoxycytidine, in which the 3´-hydroxyl group of the ribose sugar moiety is substituted with hydrogen. Zalcitabine was approved by the FDA for the treatment of HIV-1 in June 1992.

2´,3´-dideoxyinosine or didanosine is converted into dideoxyadenosine in vivo. Its development has a long history. In 1964 dideoxyadenosine, the corresponding adenosine analogue of zalcitabine was synthesised. Dideoxyadenosine caused kidney damage so didanosine was prepared from dideoxyadenosine by enzymatic oxidation (see table 1). It was found to be active against HIV without causing kidney damage. Didanosine was approved by the FDA for the treatment of HIV-1 in October 1991. Zalcitabine and didanosine are both obligate chain terminators, that have been developed for anti-HIV treatment. Unfortunately, both drugs lack selectivity and therefore cause side-effects.

Table 2 Comparison of chemical structures: Zalcitabine and lamivudine
Chemical

structure

Zalcitabine
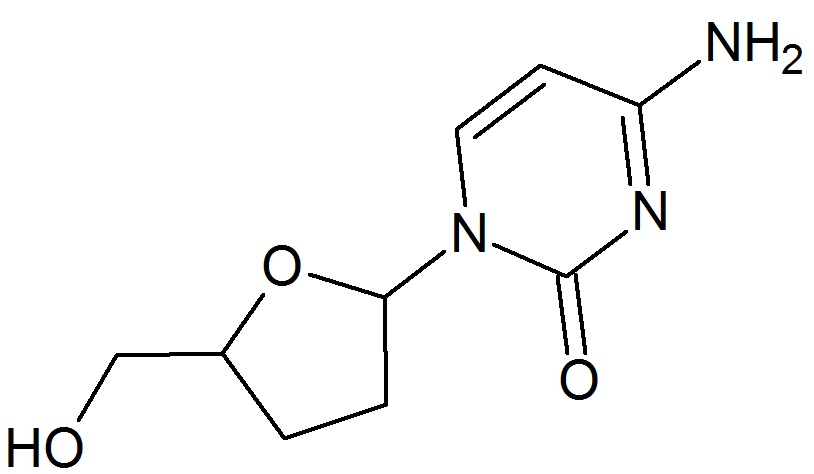
Lamivudine

Further modification of the dideoxy framework led to the development of 2´,3´-didehydro-3´-deoxythymidine (stavudine, d4T). Activity of stavudine was shown to be similar to that of zidovudine, although their phosphorylation patterns differ; the affinity for zidovudine to thymidine kinase (the enzyme responsible for the first phosphorylation) is similar to that of thymidine, whereas the affinity
for stavudine is 700-fold weaker.

2',3'-dideoxy-3'-thiacytidine (lamivudine, 3TC) was discovered by Bernard Belleau. The history of lamivudine can be traced back to the mid-1970s while Bernard Belleau was investigating sugar derivatives. Lamivudine was developed as the sulfur analogue of zalcitabine (see table 2). It was initially synthesized as a racemic mixture (BCH-189) and analysis showed that both positive and negative enantiomers of BCH-189 (2',3'-dideoxy-3'-thiacytidine) had in vitro activity against HIV. Lamivudine is the negative enantiomer and is a pyrimidine nucleoside analogue. The 3' carbon of the ribose ring of 2'-deoxycytidine has been replaced by a sulfur atom because it had greater anti-HIV activity and is less toxic than the positive enantiomer.

Next in line was 2',3'-dideoxy-5-fluoro-3'-thiacytidine (Emtricitabine, FTC) which is a structural homologue of lamivudine. The structural difference is the 5-fluoro-modification of the base moiety of lamivudine. It is similar in many ways to lamivudine and is active against both HIV-1 and hepatitis B virus (HBV).

==== Carbocyclic nucleoside ====
Carbocyclic analogues of dideoxyadenosine were investigated for their anti-HIV activity. Minimal activity was first observed. Many nucleoside analogues were prepared and examined but only one had significant activity and satisfied the requirements for clinical use. That was 2´,3´-didehydro analogue of dideoxyadenosine. Insertion of a cyclopropyl group on its 6-amino nitrogen of the adenine ring increased lipophilicity and thus enhanced brain penetration. The resulting compound is known as abacavir (see table 3). Abacavir was approved by the FDA for use in therapy of HIV-1 infections in December 1998.

This drug is the only approved antiretroviral that is active as a guanosine analogue in vivo. First it is monophosphorylated by adenosine phosphotransferase and then the monophosphate is converted to carbovir 3´-monophosphate. Subsequently, it is fully phosphorylated and the carbovir is incorporated by the RT into the DNA chain and acts as a chain terminator. Carbovir is a related guanosine analogue that had poor oral bioavailability and thus was withdrawn from clinical development.

Table 3 Comparison of chemical structures: Dideoxyadenosine, didanosine and abacavir
	Dideoxyadenosine	Didanosine	Abacavir
Chemical structure

==== Acyclic nucleotide – the only approved NtRTI ====
Nucleotide analogues require only two phosphorylation steps whereas nucleoside analogues require three steps. Reduction in the phosphorylation requirement may allow more rapid and complete conversion of drugs to their active metabolites. Such considerations have led to the development of phosphonate nucleotide analogues such as tenofovir. Tenofovir disoproxil fumarate (Tenofovir DF) is the prodrug of tenofovir. Tenofovir is an acyclic adenosine derivative. The acyclic nature of the compound and its phosphonate moiety are unique structural features among the approved NRTIs. Tenofovir DF is hydrolyzed enzymatically to tenofovir which exhibits anti-HIV activity. It was developed by the synthesis and broad spectrum antiviral activity of 2,3-dihydroxypropyladenine. Tenofovir DF was the first nucleotide reverse-transcriptase inhibitor approved by the FDA for the treatment of HIV-1 infection in October 2001.

Table 4 A schematic overview of the approved NRTIs and NtRTI and their corresponding endogenous deoxynucleosides and deoxynucleotide.
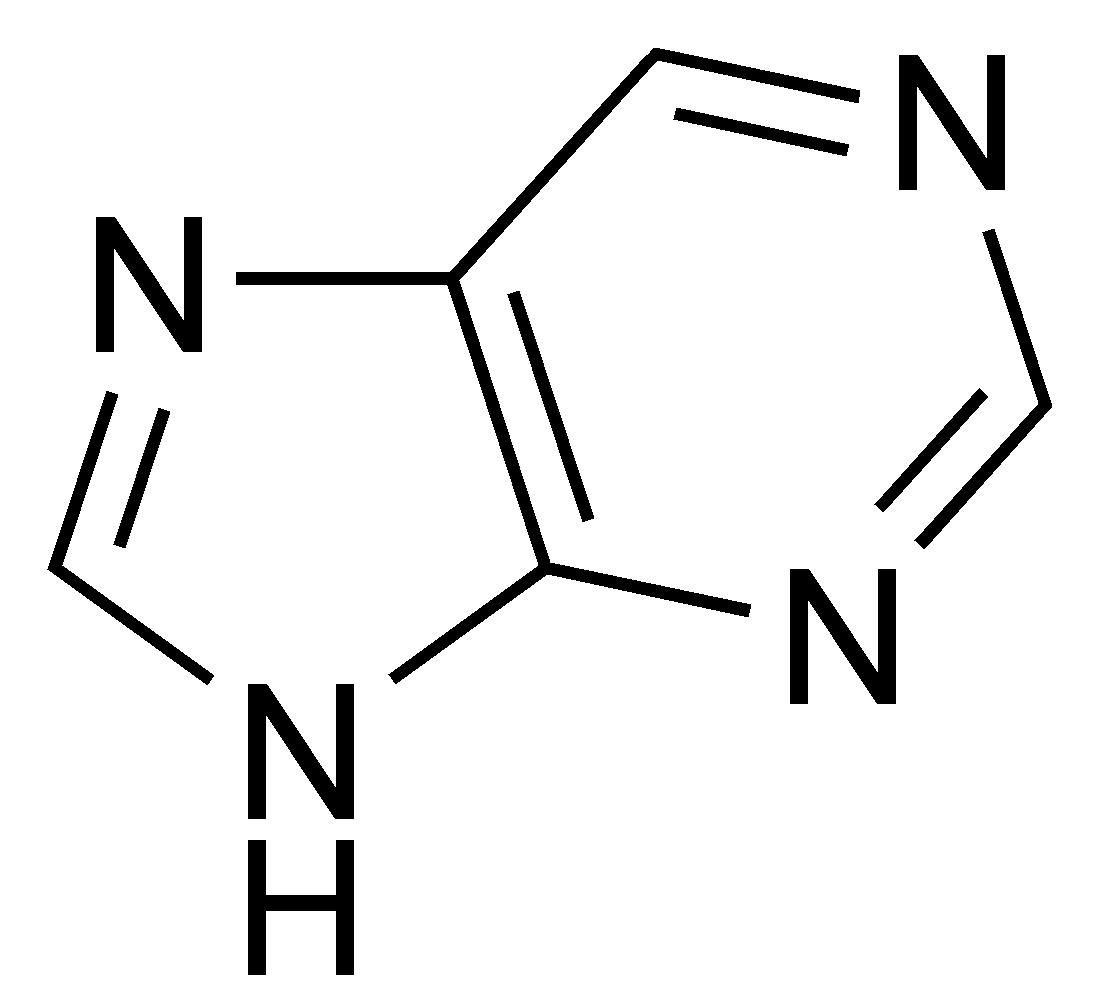
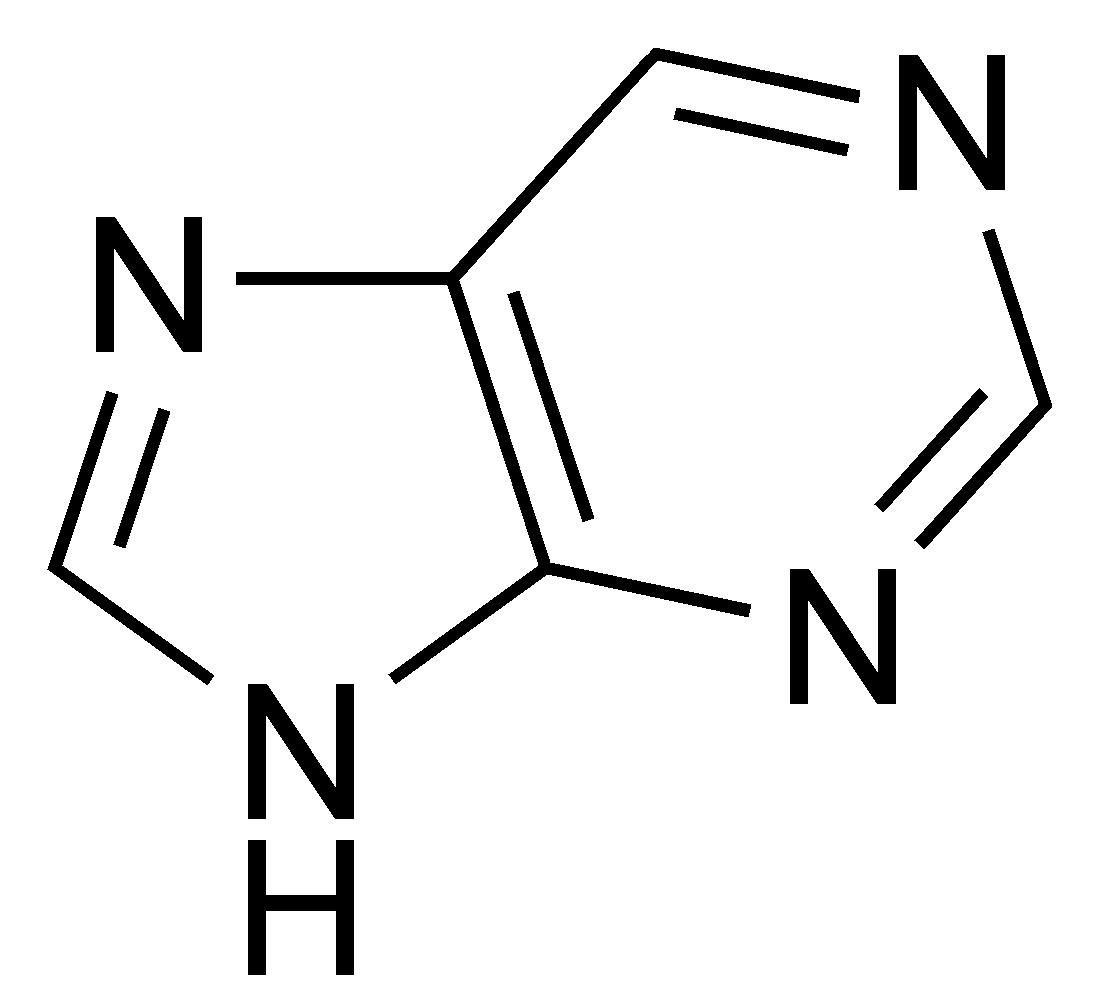
	Nucleotide analogue	Nucleoside analogues
	Purine analogues	Pyrimidine analogues					Purine analogues
N u c l e o s i d e	Adenosine	Deoxythymidine		Deoxycytidine			Adenosine	Guanosine
D r u g	Tenofovir ({[(2R)-1-(6-amino-9H- purin-9-yl)propan-2-yl]oxy}methyl) phosphonic acid	Zidovudine 3´Azido-2´,3´-dideoxythymidine, azidothymidine (AZT)	Stavudine 2´,3´-Didehydro-2´,3´-dideoxythymidine (d4T)	Emtricitabine (-)-ß-L-3´-thia-2´,3´-dideoxy-5-fluorocytidine ((-)FTC)	Lamivudine 2´,3´-Dideoxy-3´-thiacytidine (3TC)	Zalcitabine 2´,3´-Dideoxycytidine (ddC)	Didanosine 2´,3´-Dideoxyinosine (ddI)	Abacavir (4-(2-amino-6-(cyclopropylamino)- 9H-purin-9yl) cyclopent-2enyl)methanol(ABC)

why does the table eat the next section heading if nothing is written here?

== Resistance ==
Currently, appearance of drug resistant viruses is an inevitable consequence of prolonged exposure of HIV-1 to antiretroviral therapy. Drug resistance is a serious clinical concern in treatment of viral infection, and it is a particularly difficult problem in treatment of HIV. Resistance mutations are known for all approved NRTIs.

Two main mechanisms are known that cause NRTI drug resistance: Interference with the incorporation of NRTIs and excision of incorporated NRTIs. Interference with the incorporated NRTIs involves a mutation in the p66 subdomain of the RT. The mutation causes a steric hindrance that can exclude certain drugs, for example lamivudine, from being incorporated during reverse transcription. In case of excision of incorporated NRTIs the resistant enzymes readily accept the inhibitor as a substrate for incorporation into the DNA chain. Subsequently, the RT enzyme can remove the incorporated NRTI by reversing the polymerization step. The excision reaction requires a pyrophosphate donor which RT joins to the NRTI at the 3´primer terminus, excising it from the primer DNA. To achieve efficient inhibition of HIV-1 replication in patients, and to delay or prevent appearance of drug resistant viruses, drug combinations are used. HAART, also known as highly active antiretroviral therapy consists of combinations of antiviral drugs which include NRTIs, NtRTI, non-nucleoside reverse-transcriptase inhibitors and protease inhibitors.

== Current status ==
Currently, there are several NRTIs in various stages of clinical and preclinical development. The main reasons for continuing the search for new NRTIs against HIV-1 are to decrease toxicity, increase efficiency against resistant viruses, and simplify anti-HIV-1 treatment.

=== Apricitabine (ATC) ===
Apricitabine is a deoxycytidine analogue. It is structurally related to lamivudine where the positions of the oxygen and the sulfur are essentially reversed. Even though apricitabine is a little less potent in vitro compared to some other NRTIs, it maintains its activity against a broad spectrum of HIV-1 variants with NRTI resistance mutations. Apricitabine is in the final stage of clinical development for the treatment of NRTI-experienced patients.

=== Elvucitabine (L-d4FC) ===
Elvucitabine is a deoxycytidine analogue with activity against HIV resistant to several other nucleoside analogues, including zidovudine and lamivudine. This is partly because of high intracellular levels of its triphosphate metabolite reached in cells. Clinical trials of elvucitabine are on hold, because it has shown bone marrow suppression in some patients, with CD4+ cell numbers dropping as early as two days after initiation of dosing.

=== Amdoxovir (DAPD) ===
Amdoxovir is a guanosine analogue NRTI prodrug that has good bioavailability. It is deaminated intracellularly by adenosine deaminase to dioxolane guanine (DXG). DXG-triphosphate, the active form of the drug, has greater activity than DAPD-triphosphate. Amdoxovir is currently in phasa II clinical trials.

=== Racivir (RCV) ===
Racivir is a racemic mixture of the two β-enantiomers of emtricitabine (FTC), (-)-FTC and (+)-FTC. Racivir has excellent oral bioavailability and has the advantage of needing to be taken only once a day. Racivir can be considered to be used in combination of two NRTIs and has shown promising antiviral activity when used in combination. Racivir is currently in phase II clinical trials.

Table 5 Several drug candidates that are undergoing clinical development
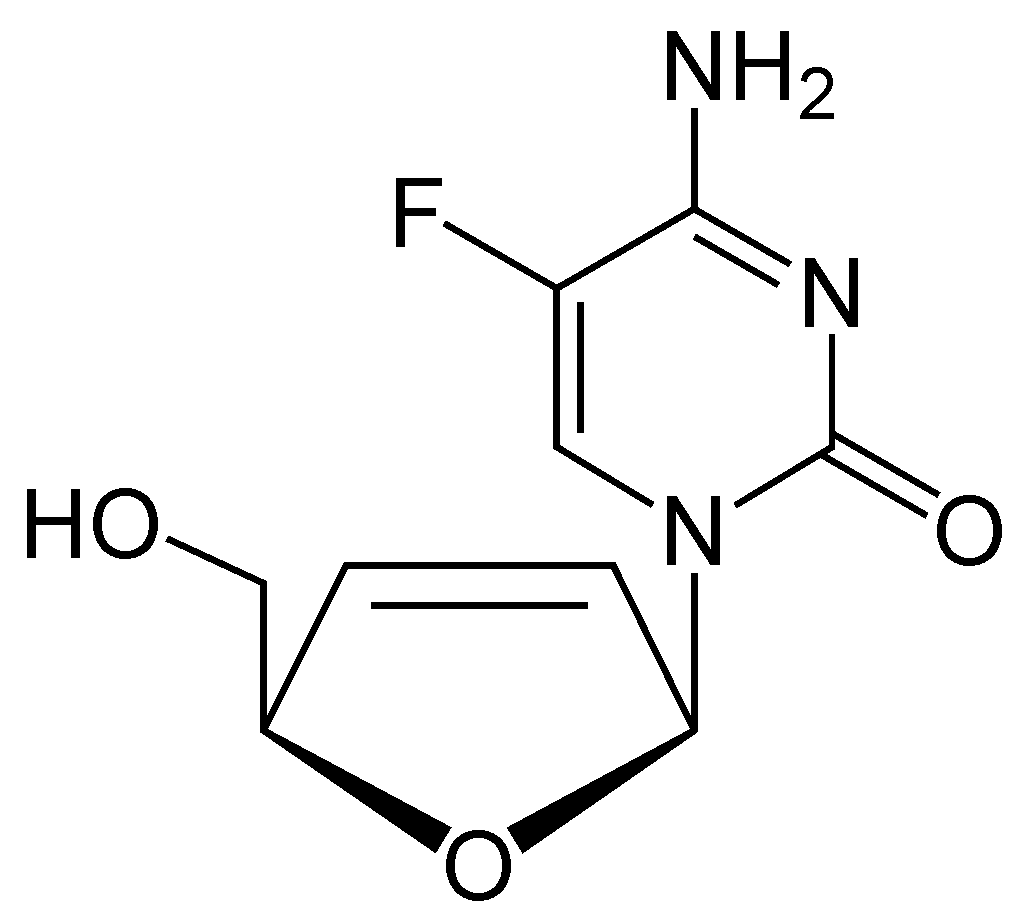
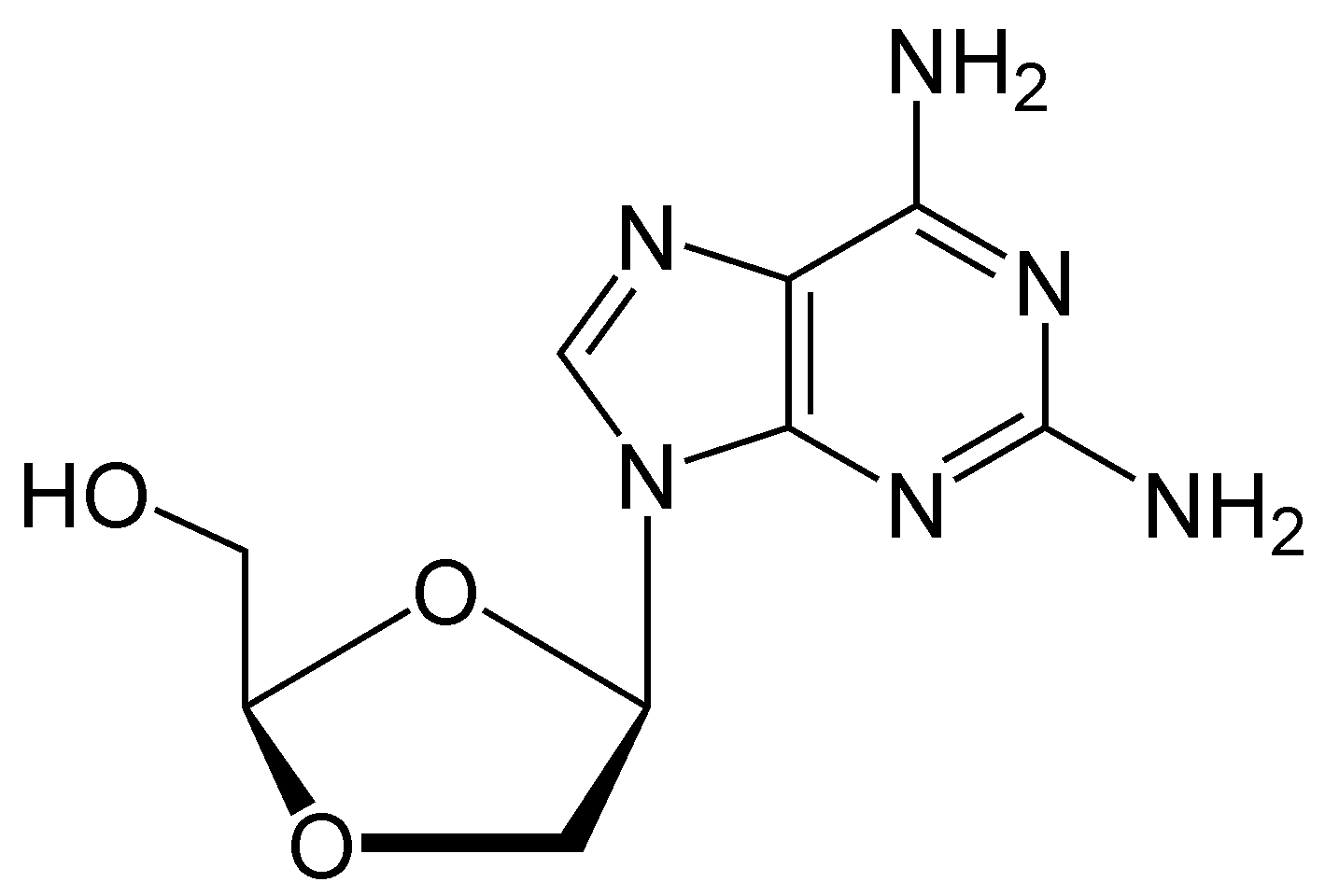
Drug candidate	Apricitabine	Elvucitabine	Amdoxovir	Racivir
Chemical structure
Phase of development	Final stage of clinical development	On hold	phase II	phase II

There are several more NRTIs in development. Either the sponsors have filed for an Investigational New Drug (IND) application, the application has been approved by the FDA or the drugs are in different phases of clinical trials. Some of the NRTIs that are in development exhibit various attractive pharmacological properties that could make them desirable for the treatment of patients in need of new agents.

== See also ==
- Antiretroviral drug
- Discovery and development of CCR5 receptor antagonists
- Discovery and Development of Non-Nucleoside Reverse-Transcriptase Inhibitors
- Discovery and development of HIV protease inhibitors
- Discovery and development of CCR5 receptor antagonists
- HIV/AIDS research
- Reverse-transcriptase inhibitor
- Protease inhibitor
- Entry inhibitor
