= Elizabeth Glaser Pediatric AIDS Foundation =

Non-profit organization in the USA

- Founded: 1988
- Founder: Elizabeth Glaser, Susie Zeegen, Susan DeLaurentis
- Type: Operating public charity (IRS exemption status): 501(c)(3)
- Location: Washington, D.C.
- Key people: Charles Lyons (President & CEO); Dr. David Kessler, M.D. (Chairman of the Board)
- Revenue: $162 million (2023)
- Expenses: $162 million (2023)
- Website: www.pedaids.org

The Elizabeth Glaser Pediatric AIDS Foundation (EGPAF) is a nonprofit organization dedicated to preventing pediatric HIV infection and eliminating pediatric AIDS through research, advocacy, and prevention and treatment programs. Founded in 1988, the organization works in 12 countries around the world.

== History ==
Elizabeth Glaser (née Elizabeth Meyer) (November 11, 1947 – December 3, 1994) was an American AIDS activist and child advocate. She was married to actor and director Paul Michael Glaser. Glaser contracted HIV in 1981 during the early stages of the AIDS epidemic after receiving a transfusion of contaminated blood while giving birth to her daughter Ariel. Glaser unknowingly passed the virus to Ariel and to her son Jake, who was born three years later.

The virus went undetected in all three family members until they underwent HIV testing in 1985, at which time Ariel began suffering from a series of unexplained illnesses. Ariel had developed advanced AIDS at a time when the medical community knew very little about the disease, and there were no available treatment options particularly for children. The U.S. Food and Drug Administration approved AZT in 1987 as a drug that could extend the lives of AIDS patients, but this approval only extended to adults. Although the Glasers fought to have their daughter treated with AZT intravenously, Ariel died from complications of AIDS in 1988.

In the aftermath of Ariel's death, and determined to save her son Jake, as well as to give hope to other HIV-positive children, Glaser co-founded the Pediatric AIDS Foundation in 1988 with friends Susan DeLaurentis and Susie Zeegen. Their work raised public awareness about HIV infection in children, and spurred funding for the development of pediatric AIDS drugs as well as research into mother-to-child transmission of HIV. In 1991, Glaser published an autobiography about her family's ordeal. The book was entitled In the Absence of Angels, and it was co-written with author Laura Palmer.

An advocate for the elimination of pediatric AIDS, Glaser became known to audiences nationwide when she was a featured speaker at the 1992 Democratic National Convention. During her speech, she criticized the federal government's underfunding of AIDS research and its lack of initiative in addressing the AIDS crisis. Elizabeth and her family also were profiled in a 1991 edition of People.

Glaser died in 1994, and the Pediatric AIDS Foundation was renamed the Elizabeth Glaser Pediatric AIDS Foundation in her honor shortly thereafter.

== Grants and awards ==
The Elizabeth Glaser Pediatric AIDS Foundation provides several grants and awards to scientists performing research aimed towards the study and eradication of pediatric AIDS. The Elizabeth Glaser Scientist Award is one of the many awards that the foundation offers through a competitive award application process.

=== Award and grant winners ===
- Margaret Feeney, M.D., M.Sc. 2006 Elizabeth Glaser Scientist Award Winner for her project, "The Immune Response to Acute Perinatal HIV Infection".
- Alexandra Trkola, Ph.D. 2006 Elizabeth Glaser Scientist Award Winner for her project, "The Humoral Immune Response to HIV".
- Jeffrey S. A. Stringer, M.D. 2002 Elizabeth Glaser Scientist Award Winner for his project, "Optimal Use of Nevirapine to Prevent Perinatal HIV".
- Sunil Kumar Ahuja, M.D. 2001 Elizabeth Glaser Scientist Award Winner for work on the influence of genetics on HIV/AIDS.
- Katherine Luzuriaga, M.D. 1997 Elizabeth Glaser Scientist Award Winner for work on HIV infections within children
