= Sunil Kumar Ahuja =

American physician

Sunil K. Ahuja
- Born: 13 March 1961 (age 65)
- Education: University of Alberta (M.S., 1986); Armed Forces Medical College (India) (M.D., 1983)
- Scientific career
- Fields: Genetics, immunology, molecular biology
- Institutions: Center for Personalized Medicine (director, 2009-present); University of Texas Health Science Center at San Antonio (professor, 2002-present); VA Center for HIV and AIDS Infection (San Antonio) (2001-present); Audie L. Murphy Memorial VA Hospital (1996-present)

Sunil Kumar Ahuja (born March 13, 1961) is a professor of Medicine, Microbiology, Immunology & Biochemistry at the University of Texas Health Science Center at San Antonio and an expert on the role of immunogenetics on HIV pathogenesis. Ahuja is also the Director of the Veterans Administration Research Center for AIDS and HIV-1 Infection. His most recent work, first published in the 2005 issue of Science, involves the ethnic group-specific role of CCR5 haplotype and CCL3L1 gene copy number on the progression of HIV to AIDS.

== Education ==
Sunil Ahuja received his medical degree from the Armed Forces Medical College India in 1983. Following work towards a M.Sc. degree from the University of Alberta in Canada, Ahuja had his internship and residency at the SUNY Health Science Center at Brooklyn.

== Publications ==
Sunil Ahuja's research has been published in many peer-reviewed journals, including Science, The New England Journal of Medicine, Nature Medicine, Nature Immunology and Proceedings of the National Academy of Sciences.

== Honors ==
Ahuja has been the recipient of many honors and awards, including being named in 2001 the Elizabeth Glaser Scientist and the Burroughs Wellcome Clinical Scientist in Translational Research. In 2005 he also was the recipient of the MERIT award from the National Institutes of Health. Less than 5% of NIH-funded researchers receive this award.

In February 2008, Ahuja was listed as one of "35 People Who Will Shape Our Future" by Texas Monthly magazine.

== Scientific disagreements ==
Some of Sunil Ahuja's work has been questioned by the scientific community. In July 2008, Ahuja's group reported that the DARC gene influenced HIV/AIDS susceptibility. This finding was then questioned by four other groups of scientists, reporting the failure to replicate. Ahuja's group responded in the same issue of Cell Host & Microbe, and also in a subsequent study published in 2011.
