= CCR5 receptor antagonist =

Cell entry inhibitor

CCR5 receptor antagonists are a class of small molecules that antagonize the CCR5 receptor. The C-C motif chemokine receptor CCR5 is involved in the process by which HIV, the virus that causes AIDS, enters cells. Hence antagonists of this receptor are entry inhibitors and have potential therapeutic applications in the treatment of HIV infections.

The life cycle of the HIV presents potential targets for drug therapy, one of them being the viral entry pathway. CCR5 and CXCR4 are the main receptors involved in the HIV entry process. These receptors belong to the seven transmembrane G-protein-coupled receptor (GPCR) family and are predominantly expressed on human T-cells, dendritic cells and macrophages, Langerhans cells. They play an important role as co-receptors that HIV type 1 (HIV-1) uses to attach to cells before viral fusion and entry into host cells. HIV isolates can be divided into R5 and X4 strains. R5 strain is when the virus uses the co-receptor CCR5 and X4 strain is when it uses CXCR4. The location of CCR5 receptors at the cell surface, both large and small molecules have the potential to interfere with the CCR5-viral interaction and inhibit viral entry into human cells.

== History ==
Since the discovery of HIV in the 1980s, remarkable progress has been made in the development of novel antiviral drugs. The trigger for the discovery of the CCR5 antagonists was the observation that a small percentage of high-risk populations showed either resistance or delayed development of the disease. This population was found to have a mutation (CCR5-Δ32) in the gene that codes for the CCR5 receptor which results in almost complete resistance against HIV-1 infection and scientists then discovered the key role of the cell surface receptors CCR5 and CXCR4 in successful viral fusion and infection. In 1996, it was demonstrated that CCR5 serves as a co-receptor for the most commonly transmitted HIV-1 strains, R5. This type of virus is predominant during the early stages of infection and remains the dominant form in over 50% of late stage HIV-1 infected patients, however R5 strains can eventually evolve into X4 as the disease progresses. This information led to the development of a new class of HIV drugs called CCR5 antagonists.

== Mechanism of action ==
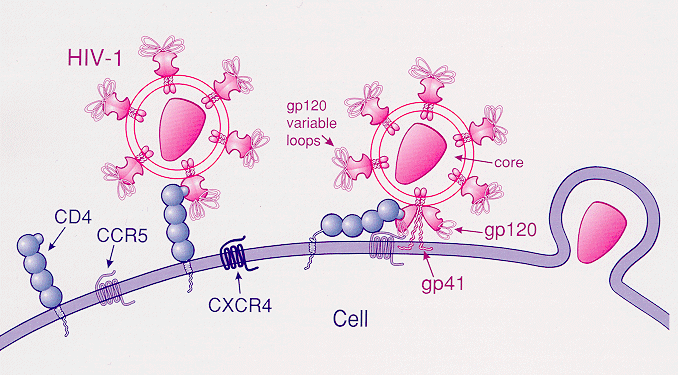
Figure 1 HIV entry into CD4+ cell via CCR5 co-receptor.

HIV enters host cells in the blood by attaching itself to receptors on the surface of the CD4+ cell. Viral entry to the CD4+ cell begins with attachment of the R5 HIV-1 glycoprotein 120 (gp120) to the CD4+ T-cell receptor, which produces a conformational change in gp120 and allows it to bind to CCR5, thereby triggering glycoprotein 41 (gp41) mediated fusion of the viral envelope with the cell membrane and the nucleocapsid enters the host cell (Figure 1). CCR5 co-receptor antagonists prevent HIV-1 from entering and infecting immune cells by blocking CCR5 cell-surface receptor. Small molecule antagonists of CCR5 bind to a hydrophobic pocket formed by the transmembrane helices of the CCR5 receptor. They are thought to interact with the receptor in an allosteric manner locking the receptor in a conformation that prohibits its co-receptor function.

== Drug development ==
As mentioned, the CCR5 receptor is a G-protein coupled receptor (GPCR). Before the discovery of CCR5's role in HIV infection, many pharmaceutical companies had already built a substantial collection of compounds that target GPCRs. Some of these compounds would prove to be a starting point for CCR5 antagonist medicinal chemistry, but would need optimization to improve CCR5 selectivity and potency, and to improve pharmacokinetic properties. A significant problem was the affinity of available screening hits for the hERG ion channel; inhibition of hERG leads to QT interval prolongation, which can increase the risk of developing fatal ventricular arrhythmias. Many CCR5 antagonists have been studied by pharmaceutical companies, but few of them have actually reached human efficacy studies; for example AstraZeneca, Novartis, Merck, and Takeda have used their GPRC-targeting compound collections to develop a potent CCR5 antagonist, but none of them have reached clinical trials. Three pharmaceutical companies were in competition to be the first to have a small molecule CCR5 antagonist approved: GlaxoSmithKline (GSK) with their compound aplaviroc, Schering-Plough with vicriviroc, and Pfizer with maraviroc. All of the compounds reached clinical trials in humans; only maraviroc has been approved by the U.S. Food and Drug Administration (FDA).

=== Leronlimab ===
Leronlimab is a humanized monoclonal antibody targeted against the CCR5 receptor found on T lymphocytes of the human immune system and many types of cancers. It is being investigated as a potential therapy in the treatment of HIV infection, graft versus host disease (NCT02737306) and metastatic cancer (NCT03838367). The United States Food and Drug Administration (FDA) has designated leronlimab for fast-track approval. In February 2008, the drug entered Phase 2 clinical trials and a phase 3 trial was begun in 2015. In February 2018 CytoDyn Inc reported that the primary endpoint has been achieved in the PRO 140 pivotal combination therapy trial in HIV infection.

Leronlimab is being developed by CytoDyn Inc. In May 2007, results from the phase I clinical trial of the drug demonstrated "potent, rapid, prolonged, dose-dependent, highly significant antiviral activity" for leronlimab. Participants in the highest-dosing group received 5 milligrams per kilogram and showed an average viral load decrease of -1.83 log_{10}. On average, reductions of greater than -1 log_{10} per millilitre were maintained for between two and three weeks, from only a single dose of the drug. The largest individual HIV RNA reductions ranged up to -2.5 log_{10} among patients receiving both the 2 and 5 mg/kg doses.

Leronlimab is a lab-made antibody that functions as an entry inhibitor. Leronlimab binds to the CCR5 receptor on the CD4 cells, and interferes with HIV's ability to enter the cell. Leronlimab, a humanized form of a PA14 antibody, is a chemokine-receptor CCR5 monoclonal antibody and can inhibit CCR5 tropic HIV-1 at concentrations that do not antagonize the natural activity of CCR5 in vitro. HIV-1 entry is mediated by the HIV-1 envelope glycoproteins gp120 and gp41. The gp120 will bind CD4 and the CCR5co receptor molecule, and this triggers gp41-mediated fusion of the viral and cellular membranes. CCR5 is hence needed for the entry of the virus and this infection of healthy cells. Leronlimab, the anti-CCR5 monoclonal antibody, can stop HIV from entering the cell and stop viral replication. It prevents the virus-cell binding at a distinct site in the CCR5 co-receptor without interfering with its natural activity. Unlike other entry inhibitors, PRO 140 is a monoclonal antibody. The mechanism of inhibition is competitive rather than allosteric. As such, it must be injected to be effective. However, once inside the body, PRO 140 binds to CCR5 for >60 days, which may allow for dosing as infrequently as every other week. Compared to highly-active antiretroviral therapy which has been shown to have treatment-related toxicities for HIV-infected patients, PRO140 has no multi-drug resistance or toxicities.

In February 2018, CytoDyn reported that the primary endpoint has been achieved in the PRO 140 pivotal combination therapy trial in HIV infection and will continue for an additional 24 weeks (end of August 2018) with PRO 140 weekly subcutaneous injections and optimized ART. The report discloses that a single 350 mg subcutaneous injection of PRO 140 resulted in a HIV-1 RNA viral load reduction greater than 0.5log or 68% within one week compared with those who received a placebo. The primary efficacy endpoint results were presented at ASM Microbe 2018. In the pivotal trial of leronlimab in combination with standard anti-retroviral therapies in HIV-infected treatment-experienced patients, 81% of patients completing trial achieved HIV viral load suppression of < 50 cp/mL. Recent approved drugs for this population range from 43% after 24 weeks to 45% after 48 weeks with viral load suppression of < 50 cp/mL. In March 2019, CytoDyn filed with the US FDA the first part of the BLA for leronlimab (PRO140) as a combination therapy with HAART in HIV. In May 2020, the company filed its BLA with potential FDA approval in 4Q'20. CytoDyn is conducting an investigative monotherapy trial of leronlimab (PRO140) for HIV. If successful, once per week self-administered leronlimab would represent a paradigm shift in treatment of HIV.

CytoDyn is investigating the use of leronlimab in various solid tumors. On February 18, 2019, CytoDyn announced it will begin 8 pre-clinical studies on melanoma cancer, pancreatic, breast, prostate, colon, lung, liver, and stomach cancer. This has the potential to lead to 8 phase II clinical studies with leronlimab in the cancer arena. On November 23, 2018, CytoDyn received FDA approval of its IND submission and allowed to initiate a Phase Ib/II clinical trial for metastatic triple-negative breast cancer (mTNBC) patients. On February 20, 2019, CytoDyn announced that leronlimab was able to reduce by more than 98% the incidence of human breast cancer metastasis in a mouse xenograft model for cancer through six weeks with leronlimab. The temporal equivalency of the murine 6 weeks study may be up to 6 years in humans. In May 2019, the U.S. Food and Drug Administration (FDA) granted fast track designation for leronlimab for use in combination with carboplatin for the treatment of patients with CCR5-positive mTNBC. In July 2019, CytoDyn announced the dosing of first mTNBC patient under compassionate use. Simultaneously, the Phase Ib/II trial for treatment-naïve mTNBC patients is active and anticipates top line data in 2020. If successful, the data from treatment-naïve mTNBC patients could serve as the basis for potentially seeking accelerated US FDA approval.

A study demonstrated leronlimab reduced the number and size of new human breast cancer metastasis in a mouse model and reduced the size of established metastasis thereby extending survival.

In May 2019, CytoDyn initiated pre-clinical study of leronlimab to prevent NASH.

=== Aplaviroc ===
Figure 2. Molecular structure of aplaviroc and its lead compound

Figure 3 Molecular structure of vicriviroc and its lead compounds

Aplaviroc is originated from a class of spirodiketopiperazine derivatives. Figure 2 shows the molecular structure of the lead compound and the final compound aplaviroc. The lead compound showed good potency in blocking CCR5 in a number of R5 HIV strains and against multi-drug resistant strains. The problem with this compound was not its CCR5 selectivity but the oral bioavailability. This led to further development of the molecule and the result was a compound named aplaviroc. Unfortunately, despite the promising preclinical and early clinical results, some severe liver toxicity was observed in the treatment of naïve and treatment-experienced patients that led to the discontinuation in further development of aplaviroc.

=== Vicriviroc ===
Schering-Plough identified an active compound during screening. Figure 3 shows the molecular structure of the lead compound, intermediate compound, and the final compound vicriviroc. The lead compound contained a piperazine scaffold and was a potent muscarinic acetylcholine receptor (M_{2}) antagonist with modest CCR5 activity. The changes that were made on the left hand side of the lead compound and the addition of a methyl group on the piperazine group ((S)-methylpiperazine) resulted in the intermediate compound that had good affinity for CCR5 receptors but very little affinity for muscarinic activity, however, the compound did show affinity for the hERG ion channel. Further reconstruction led to the development of the final compound vicriviroc, when Schering discovered that the pyridyl N-oxide on the intermediate could be replaced by 4,6-dimethylpyrimidine carboxamide. Vicriviroc had an excellent selectivity for CCR5 receptors over muscarinic and hERG affinity was greatly reduced. Phase I clinical trial of vicriviroc gave promising results, so a phase II study in the treatment of naïve patients was initiated. The phase II study was discontinued since there was a viral breakthrough in the vicriviroc group compared to the control group. These results suggested that vicriviroc was not effective in the treatment of treatment-naïve patients compared to current treatments. Another phase II clinical study was performed in treatment-experienced patients. The results were that vicriviroc did have strong antiviral activity but five instances of cancer among the participants were reported, however, the study was continued since there was lack of causal association of the malignancies and vicriviroc. In late 2009, vicriviroc was reported by the company to have entered phase II studies in treatment for naïve patients and phase III studies in treatment-experienced patients.

=== Maraviroc ===
Pfizer turned to high-throughput screening in their search for a good starting point for a small molecule CCR5 antagonist. Their screening resulted in a compound that presented weak affinity and no antiviral activity but represented a good starting point for further optimization. Compounds 1–9 in Table 1 show the development of maraviroc in few steps. The chemical structure of the starting molecule (UK-107,543) is presented as compound 1. Their first focus was to minimize CYP2D6 activity of the molecule and to reduce its lipophilicity. They replaced the imidazopyridine with benzimidazole and the benzhydril group was swapped out for a benzamide. The outcome was compound 2. That compound showed good binding potency and the start of an antiviral activity. Further structure–activity relationship (SAR) optimization of the amide region and identifying the enantiomeric preference led to the cyclobutyl amide structure in compound 3. However, the problem with the CYP2D6 activity of the compound was still unacceptable so they had to perform further SAR optimization that determined that the [3.2.1]-azabicycloamine (tropane) could replace the aminopiperidine moiety. This change in the chemical structure led to compound 4. Compound 4 had no CYP2D6 activity while preserving excellent binding affinity and antiviral activity. Although compound 4 showed promising results, it demonstrated 99% inhibition on the hERG ion channel. That inhibition was unacceptable since it can lead to QTc interval prolongation. The research team then did a few modifications to see which part of the molecule played a role in the hERG affinity. Compound 5 shows an analogue that they synthesized which contained an oxygen bridgehead in the tropane ring; however, that reconstruction did not have an effect on the hERG affinity. They then focused on the polar surface area in the molecule to dial out the hERG affinity. These efforts resulted in compound 6. That compound preserved desired antiviral activity and was selective against the hERG inhibition but the problem was its bioavailability. Reduction in the lipophilicity, by replacing the benzimidazol group with a substituted triazole group gave compound 7. Compound 7 had shown a significant reduction in lipophilicity and maintained the antiviral activity but again, with the introduction of a cyclobutyl group, the compound showed hERG inhibition. Changing the ring size in compound 7 from a cyclobutyl unit to a cyclopentyl unit in compound 8 led to a significant increase in antiviral activity and loss of hERG affinity. Further development led to discovery of a 4,4'-difluorocyclohexylamide also known as maraviroc. Maraviroc preserved excellent antiviral activity, whilst demonstrating no significant hERG binding affinity. The lack of hERG binding affinity was predicted to be because of the large size of the cyclohexyl group and the high polarity of the fluoro substituents. In August 2007 the FDA approved the first CCR5 antagonist, maraviroc, discovered and developed by Pfizer.

Table 1 represents the molecular structures in the development of maraviroc. Blue indicates differences from the previous step
Compound 1	Compound 2	Compound 3
Compound 4	Compound 5	Compound 6
Compound 7	Compound 8	Compound 9 (maraviroc)

== Pharmacophore ==
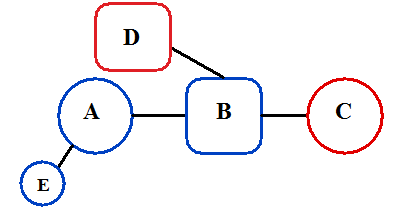
Figure 4 Predictive pharmacophore model for piperidine- and piperazine-based CCR5 antagonists

The predictive pharmacophore model was developed for a large series of piperidine- and piperazine-based CCR5 antagonists by Schering-Plough Research Institute. Their hypothesis consisted of mostly five features, two hydrogen bond acceptors, marked C and D in figure 4 and three hydrophobic groups, A, B and E in figure 4. Part B usually has a basic nitrogen group. The model was validated using diverse set of six CCR5 antagonists from five different pharmaceutical companies. The best model correctly predicted these compounds as being highly active. It is possible to use the model as a tool in virtual screening for new small molecular CCR5 antagonists and also to predict biological activities of compounds prior to undertaking their costly synthesis.

== Binding ==
Figure 5. Putative binding of aplaviroc to the CCR5 receptor

Figure 6. Putative binding of maraviroc to the CCR5 receptor

CCR5 is a member of G protein-coupled, seven transmembrane segment receptors. The structure of the receptor comprises seven-helix bundle in the transmembrane region, these regions are labeled I–VII in figures 5 and 6. The CCR5 antagonists are predicted to bind to a putative binding pocket which is buried inside the transmembrane domain, enclosed by the seven transmembrane helices. The binding pocket is very hydrophobic with multiple aromatic residues lining the pocket. The key residues are tryptophan 86 and 248 (Trp86, Trp248), tyrosine 108 and 251 (Tyr108, Tyr251), phenylalanine 109 (Phe109), threonine 195 (Thr195), isoleucine 198 (Ile198), glutamic acid 283 (Glu283). CCR5 antagonists are very different in shape and electrostatic potential although they all share the same binding pocket. The interesting thing about the binding of these molecules is that they exhibit significantly different binding modes, although they all establish an extensive interaction network with CCR5.

=== Aplaviroc ===
The putative binding mode for aplaviroc is shown in figure 5. The key saltbridge interaction between aplaviroc and Glu283 is predicted to be quite weak compared to other CCR5 antagonists. The hydroxyl group on aplaviroc forms a strong hydrogen bond to the polar residue Thr195. This H-bond interaction is the strongest with aplaviroc compared to other CCR5 antagonists. The cyclohexyl group in the aplaviroc structure is predicted to interact with the receptor in a hydrophobic pocket formed by Ile198, Thr195 and Phe109 and is thought to show quite strong hydrophobic interactions. The researchers predict that the butyl group of aplaviroc is buried within the helical bundle through strong hydrophobic interaction with multiple aromatic residues of the CCR5 receptor. Aplaviroc has a unique feature of preserving two of the natural chemokine protein ligands binding to CCR5 and subsequent activation, whereas maraviroc and the other antagonists almost fully block chemokine-CCR5 interactions. This kind of interference is so far considered to be safe, and individuals that naturally lack CCR5 do not show any obvious health problems. However, to limit the toxicity and side effects of CCR5 antagonists it would be ideal to be able to preserve the chemokine receptor function. Consequently, it should be of interest to design inhibitors that specifically disrupt CCR5–gp120 binding but do not affect the CCR5 chemokine activation.

=== Maraviroc ===
The putative binding mode for maraviroc is shown in figure 6. The strongest interaction is estimated to be between maraviroc and glutamic acid (Glu283) through a strong salt bridge interaction. The interaction between tryptophan (Trp86) and maraviroc involves T-shaped π-π stacking while the interaction with phenylalanine (Phe109) is predicted to be hydrophobic. Tyrosine (Tyr108) is thought to interact with the phenyl group on maraviroc through a parallel displaced interaction. The interaction between maraviroc and isoleucine (Ile198) is predicted to be mostly hydrophobic in nature and the interaction between maraviroc and tyrosine (Tyr251) is very limited.

== Other CCR5 antagonists ==
Figure 7. Molecular structure of compound A

Development of new CCR5 antagonists continues, both for their antiviral effects and also for potential utility in a variety of autoimmune indications. Researchers at Roche Palo Alto discovered a novel series of potent CCR5 small-molecule antagonists. Lead optimization was pursued by balancing opposing trends of metabolic stability and potency. Combination of the spiropiperidine template with pharmacophore elements from both aplaviroc, and Schering's CCR5 antagonist program, led to the initial lead compound in this series. Further development of that lead compound led to the discovery of compound A in figure 7 — a compound that possesses a good selectivity and pharmacokinetic properties.

The CCR5 antagonist INCB009471 has nanomolar activity against HIV-1 in vitro. This compound demonstrated potent and prolonged antiviral activity against R5-tropic HIV-1 when given 200 mg once daily dose for 14 days. These findings supported further clinical development of INCB009471 and they have since progressed to phase IIb clinical trials. As of 2009 the study of this compound is inactive and no further studies are planned at this time.

Not only small molecules but also proteins delivered by gene therapy have been suggested to ablate CCR5 function, an approach that has also been employed for other HIV targets.

== See also ==
- HIV/AIDS research
- Cenicriviroc
- CD4
- CCL5
- CCR5
- Subtypes of HIV
- HIV tropism
- Discovery and development of non-nucleoside reverse transcriptase inhibitors
- Discovery and development of nucleoside and nucleotide reverse-transcriptase inhibitors
