= Tropifexor =

Chemical compound

Clinical data
- ATC code: None

Identifiers
- IUPAC name: 2-[(1R,5S)-3-[[5-Cyclopropyl-3-[2-(trifluoromethoxy)phenyl]-1,2-oxazol-4-yl]methoxy]-8-azabicyclo[3.2.1]octan-8-yl]-4-fluoro-1,3-benzothiazole-6-carboxylic acid
- CAS Number: 1383816-29-2
- PubChem CID: 121418176
- UNII: NMZ08KM76Z
- KEGG: D11548

Chemical and physical data
- Formula: C_{29}H_{25}F_{4}N_{3}O_{5}S
- Molar mass: 603.59 g·mol^{−1}
- 3D model (JSmol): Interactive image
- SMILES: C1C[C@H]2CC(C[C@@H]1N2C3=NC4=C(C=C(C=C4S3)C(=O)O)F)OCC5=C(ON=C5C6=CC=CC=C6OC(F)(F)F)C7CC7
- InChI: InChI=1S/C29H25F4N3O5S/c30-21-9-15(27(37)38)10-23-25(21)34-28(42-23)36-16-7-8-17(36)12-18(11-16)39-13-20-24(35-41-26(20)14-5-6-14)19-3-1-2-4-22(19)40-29(31,32)33/h1-4,9-10,14,16-18H,5-8,11-13H2,(H,37,38)/t16-,17+,18+; Key:VYLOOGHLKSNNEK-PIIMJCKOSA-N

Tropifexor is an investigational drug that acts as an agonist of the farnesoid X receptor (FXR). It was discovered by researchers from Novartis and Genomics Institute of the Novartis Research Foundation. Its synthesis and pharmacological properties were published in 2017. It was developed for the treatment of cholestatic liver diseases and nonalcoholic steatohepatitis (NASH). In combination with cenicriviroc, a CCR2 and CCR5 receptor inhibitor, it is undergoing a phase II clinical trial for NASH and liver fibrosis.

Rats treated orally with tropifexor (0.03 to 1 mg/kg) showed an upregulation of the FXR target genes, BSEP and SHP, and a down-regulation of CYP8B1. Its EC50 for FXR is between 0.2 and 0.26 nM depending on the biochemical assay.

The patent that covers tropifexor and related compounds was published in 2010.
