= Aplaviroc =

Chemical compound

Clinical data
- Routes of administration: Oral
- ATC code: none

Legal status
- Legal status: Development terminated

Identifiers
- IUPAC name: 4-(4-{[(3R)-1-butyl-3-[(R)-cyclohexylhydroxymethyl]-2,5-dioxo- 1,4,9-triazaspiro[5.5]undecan-9-yl]methyl}phenoxy)benzoic acid
- CAS Number: 461443-59-4; HCl: 461023-63-2
- PubChem CID: 3001322
- IUPHAR/BPS: 805
- DrugBank: DB06497
- ChemSpider: 2272720
- UNII: 98B425P30V; HCl: 04D148Z3VR
- KEGG: D06557
- ChEMBL: ChEMBL1255794
- CompTox Dashboard (EPA): DTXSID6047317

Chemical and physical data
- Formula: C_{33}H_{43}N_{3}O_{6}
- Molar mass: 577.722 g·mol^{−1}
- 3D model (JSmol): Interactive image
- SMILES: CCCCN1C(=O)[C@H](NC(=O)C12CCN(CC2)CC3=CC=C(C=C3)OC4=CC=C(C=C4)C(=O)O)[C@@H](C5CCCCC5)O
- InChI: InChI=1S/C33H43N3O6/c1-2-3-19-36-30(38)28(29(37)24-7-5-4-6-8-24)34-32(41)33(36)17-20-35(21-18-33)22-23-9-13-26(14-10-23)42-27-15-11-25(12-16-27)31(39)40/h9-16,24,28-29,37H,2-8,17-22H2,1H3,(H,34,41)(H,39,40)/t28-,29-/m1/s1; Key:GWNOTCOIYUNTQP-FQLXRVMXSA-N

Aplaviroc (INN, codenamed AK602 and GSK-873140) is a CCR5 entry inhibitor that belongs to a class of 2,5-diketopiperazines developed for the treatment of HIV infection. It was developed by GlaxoSmithKline.

In October 2005, all studies of aplaviroc were discontinued due to liver toxicity concerns. Some authors have claimed that evidence of poor efficacy may have contributed to termination of the drug's development; the ASCENT study, one of the discontinued trials, showed aplaviroc to be under-effective in many patients even at high concentrations.

== See also ==
- CCR5 receptor antagonist
