= Amdoxovir =

Medication

Clinical data
- ATC code: none

Identifiers
- IUPAC name: [(2R,4R)-4-(2,6-diaminopurin-9-yl)-1,3-dioxolan-2-yl]methanol
- CAS Number: 145514-04-1
- PubChem CID: 124088
- ChemSpider: 110576
- UNII: 54I81H0M9C
- KEGG: D02890
- ChEMBL: ChEMBL458876
- NIAID ChemDB: 005431
- CompTox Dashboard (EPA): DTXSID801027435

Chemical and physical data
- Formula: C_{9}H_{12}N_{6}O_{3}
- Molar mass: 252.234 g·mol^{−1}
- 3D model (JSmol): Interactive image
- SMILES: n2c1c(nc(nc1n(c2)[C@@H]3O[C@@H](OC3)CO)N)N
- InChI: InChI=1S/C9H12N6O3/c10-7-6-8(14-9(11)13-7)15(3-12-6)4-2-17-5(1-16)18-4/h3-5,16H,1-2H2,(H4,10,11,13,14)/t4-,5-/m1/s1; Key:RLAHNGKRJJEIJL-RFZPGFLSSA-N

Amdoxovir is a pharmaceutical drug that has undergone research for the treatment of HIV/AIDS. It acts as a nucleoside reverse transcriptase inhibitor (NRTI). The drug was discovered by Raymond F. Schinazi (Emory University) and C.K. Chu (University of Georgia) and developed by RFS Pharma.

Amdoxovir was in advanced Phase II clinical trials around 2010. In 2013, a Phase II trial was terminated and another was withdrawn before it started. No further studies appear to have been done.
