= CCL3L1 =

Protein-coding gene in humans

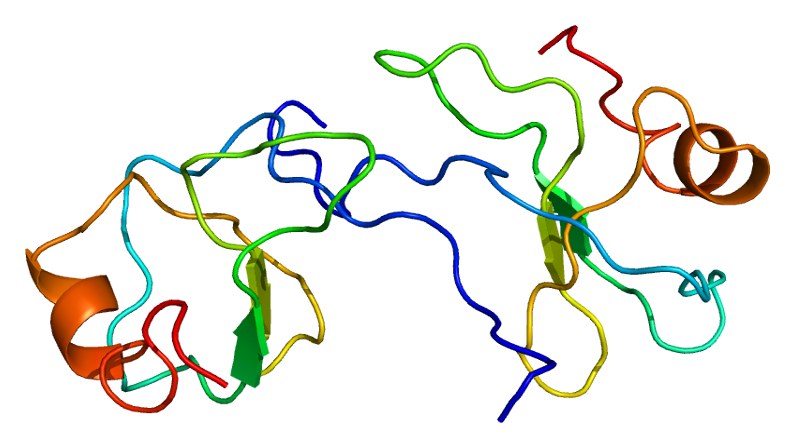

Identifiers
- Aliases: CCL3L1, 464.2, D17S1718, G0S19-2, LD78, LD78-beta(1-70), LD78BETA, MIP1AP, SCYA3L, SCYA3L1, C-C motif chemokine ligand 3 like 1
- External IDs: OMIM: 601395; GeneCards: CCL3L1
Gene ontology
Molecular function	chemokine activity; cytokine activity; CCR chemokine receptor binding
Cellular component	extracellular region; extracellular space
Biological process	lymphocyte chemotaxis; chemokine-mediated signaling pathway; G protein-coupled receptor signaling pathway; positive regulation of GTPase activity; cellular response to tumor necrosis factor; chemotaxis; inflammatory response; cellular response to interleukin-1; monocyte chemotaxis; neutrophil chemotaxis; negative regulation of cell population proliferation; positive regulation of ERK1 and ERK2 cascade; immune response; cellular response to interferon-gamma; regulation of signaling receptor activity; cytokine-mediated signaling pathway; positive regulation of inflammatory response
Sources:Amigo / QuickGO
Orthologs
Databases	NCBI: entry
Species	Human	Mouse
Entrez	6349	n/a
Ensembl	n/a	n/a
UniProt	P16619	n/a
RefSeq (mRNA)	NM_021006	n/a
RefSeq (protein)	NP_001001437; NP_066286	n/a
Location (UCSC)	n/a	n/a
PubMed search		n/a
- Wikidata
View/Edit Human

Chemokine (C-C motif) ligand 3-like 1, also known as CCL3L1, is a protein which in humans is encoded by the CCL3L1 gene.

== Function ==
This gene is one of several chemokine genes clustered on the q-arm of chromosome 17. Chemokines are a family of secreted proteins involved in immunoregulatory and inflammatory processes. Specifically, chemokines attract lymphocytes to sites of infection or damage. This protein binds to several chemokine receptors including chemokine binding protein 2 (CCBP2 or D6) and chemokine (C-C motif) receptor 5 (CCR5).

CCR5 is a co-receptor for HIV, and binding of CCL3L1 to CCR5 inhibits HIV entry. Furthermore, the binding causes the receptor to be taken inside the cell by endocytosis, to eventually be reprocessed and re-expressed.

== Gene organization ==
The human genome reference assembly contains two full copies of the gene (CCL3L1 and CCL3L3) and an additional partial duplication, which is thought to result in a pseudogene, designated CCL3L2. This record represents the more telomeric full-length gene.

== Clinical significance ==
The copy number of this gene varies among individuals. This is hypothesized to be due to segmental duplication of the region containing CCL3. Most individuals have 1-6 copies in the diploid genome, although rare individuals have zero or more than six copies. With increased copy number, there is more CCL3L1 expressed, and so competition for the CCR5 binding site is increased. This leads to slower advancement of disease in HIV-infected individuals, giving those with greater copy number more resistance.

== Interactions ==
CCL3L1 has been shown to interact with CCR5.
