= Fosdevirine =

Chemical compound

Clinical data
- Other names: GSK2248761; GSK2248761A; IDX-12899; IDX-899
- ATC code: None

Identifiers
- IUPAC name: 5-Chloro-3-[[3-[(E)-2-cyanoethenyl]-5-methylphenyl]-methoxyphosphoryl]-1H-indole-2-carboxamide
- CAS Number: 1018450-26-4
- PubChem CID: 44232529
- ChemSpider: 28529638
- UNII: Z4I0C281BJ
- KEGG: D09906
- ChEMBL: ChEMBL2104968

Chemical and physical data
- Formula: C_{20}H_{17}ClN_{3}O_{3}P
- Molar mass: 413.80 g·mol^{−1}
- 3D model (JSmol): Interactive image
- SMILES: CC1=CC(=CC(=C1)/C=C/C#N)[P@](=O)(C2=C(NC3=C2C=C(C=C3)Cl)C(=O)N)OC
- InChI: InChI=1S/C20H17ClN3O3P/c1-12-8-13(4-3-7-22)10-15(9-12)28(26,27-2)19-16-11-14(21)5-6-17(16)24-18(19)20(23)25/h3-6,8-11,24H,1-2H3,(H2,23,25)/b4-3+/t28-/m1/s1; Key:CGBYTKOSZYQOPV-ASSBYYIWSA-N

Fosdevirine is an experimental antiviral agent of the non-nucleoside reverse transcriptase inhibitor class that was studied for potential use in the treatment of HIV-AIDS.

It was discovered by Idenix Pharmaceuticals and was being developed by GlaxoSmithKline and ViiV Healthcare, but it has now been discontinued due to unexpected side effects.
