= CCR5 =

Immune system protein

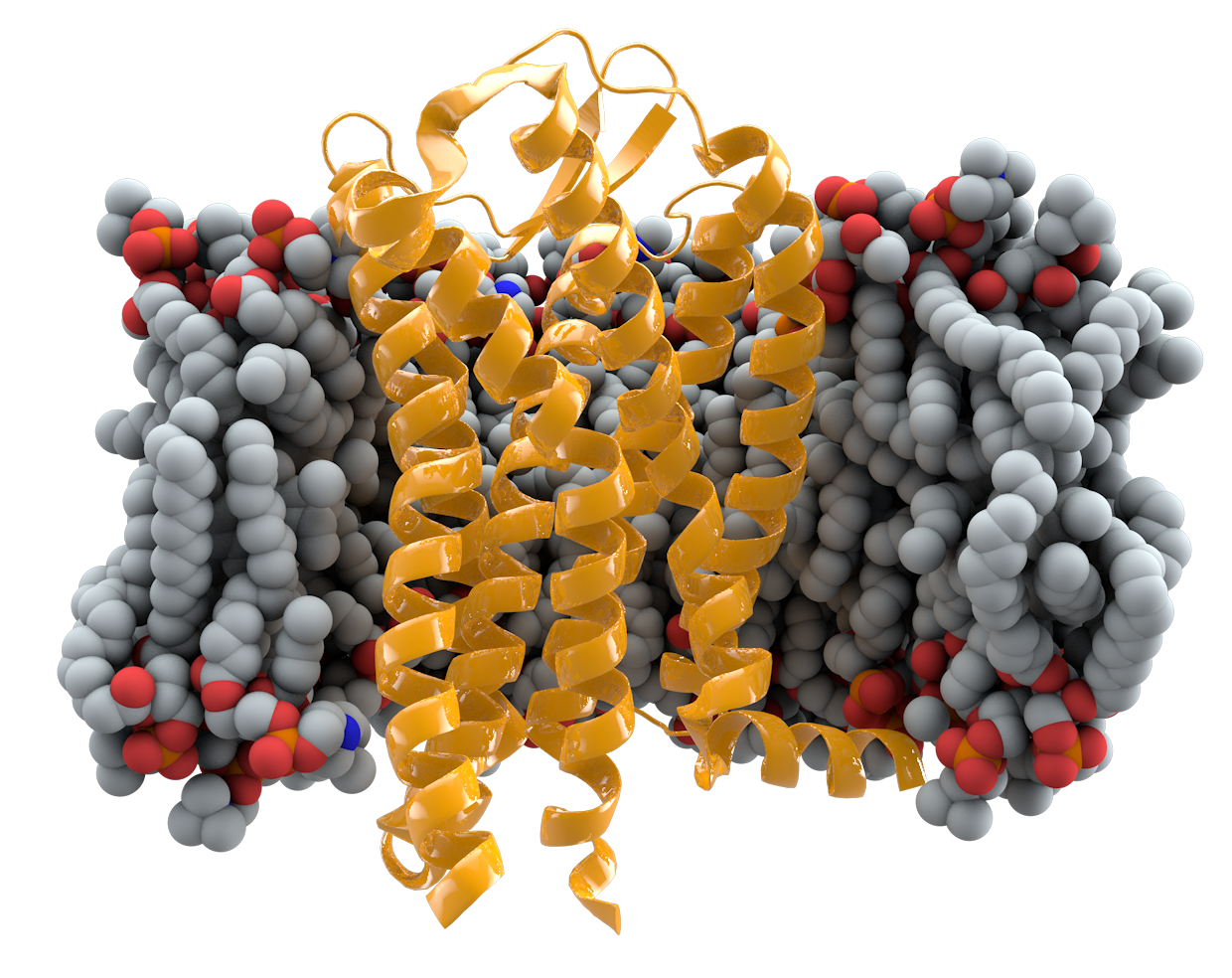

Identifiers
- Aliases: CCR5, CC-CKR-5, CCCKR5, CCR-5, CD195, CKR-5, CKR5, CMKBR5, IDDM22, C-C motif chemokine receptor 5 (gene/pseudogene), C-C motif chemokine receptor 5
- External IDs: OMIM: 601373; MGI: 107182; GeneCards: CCR5
Available structures
PDB	Ortholog search: PDBe RCSB
PDB	List of PDB id codes 2L87, 2RLL, 2RRS, 2MZX, 4MBS

Gene location (Human)
Chr.	Chromosome 3 (human)
Band	3p21.31	Start	46,370,946 bp
Band	3p21.31	End	46,376,206 bp

Gene location (Mouse)
Chr.	Chromosome 9 (mouse)
Band	9 F4|9 75.05 cM	Start	123,921,580 bp
Band	9 F4|9 75.05 cM	End	123,947,736 bp
RNA expression pattern
Bgee	Human / Mouse (ortholog); Top expressed in: epithelium of nasopharynx; parietal pleura; visceral pleura; palpebral conjunctiva; granulocyte; germinal epithelium; mucosa of urinary bladder; appendix; superficial temporal artery; jejunal mucosa / Top expressed in: lumbar subsegment of spinal cord; morula; lumbar spinal ganglion; blood; embryo; lymph node; mesenteric lymph nodes; submandibular gland; blastocyst; embryo; More reference expression data
BioGPS	n/a
Gene ontology
Molecular function	G protein-coupled receptor activity; coreceptor activity; chemokine (C-C motif) ligand 5 binding; virus receptor activity; signal transducer activity; protein binding; chemokine receptor activity; C-C chemokine receptor activity; actin binding; phosphatidylinositol phospholipase C activity; C-C chemokine binding; chemokine binding
Cellular component	cytoplasm; integral component of membrane; endosome; membrane; plasma membrane; integral component of plasma membrane; external side of plasma membrane; cell surface
Biological process	G protein-coupled receptor signaling pathway; signaling; response to cholesterol; release of sequestered calcium ion into cytosol by sarcoplasmic reticulum; positive regulation of cytosolic calcium ion concentration; cell-cell signaling; dendritic cell chemotaxis; MAPK cascade; chemotaxis; cellular defense response; cell surface receptor signaling pathway; immune response; inflammatory response; cellular response to lipopolysaccharide; calcium ion transport; calcium-mediated signaling; signal transduction; fusion of virus membrane with host plasma membrane; chemokine-mediated signaling pathway; viral process; defense response; negative regulation of macrophage apoptotic process; cytokine-mediated signaling pathway; cell chemotaxis
Sources:Amigo / QuickGO
Orthologs
Databases	NCBI: entry; OMA: entry
Species	Human	Mouse
Entrez	1234	12774
Ensembl	ENSG00000160791	ENSMUSG00000079227
UniProt	P51681	P51682
RefSeq (mRNA)	NM_001100168; NM_000579; NM_001394783	NM_009917
RefSeq (protein)	NP_000570; NP_001093638	NP_034047
Location (UCSC)	Chr 3: 46.37 – 46.38 Mb	Chr 9: 123.92 – 123.95 Mb
PubMed search
- Wikidata
View/Edit Human	View/Edit Mouse

C-C chemokine receptor type 5, also known as CCR5 or CD195, is a protein on the surface of white blood cells that is involved in the immune system as it acts as a receptor for chemokines.

In humans, the CCR5 gene that encodes the CCR5 protein is located on the short (p) arm at position 21 on chromosome 3. Certain populations have inherited the Delta 32 mutation, resulting in the genetic deletion of a portion of the CCR5 gene. Homozygous carriers of this mutation are resistant to infection by macrophage-tropic (M-tropic) strains of HIV-1.

== Tissue distribution ==
CCR5 is predominantly expressed on T cells, macrophages, dendritic cells, eosinophils, microglia and a subpopulation of either breast or prostate cancer cells. The expression of CCR5 is selectively induced during the cancer transformation process and is not expressed in normal breast or prostate epithelial cells. Approximately 50% of human breast cancer expressed CCR5, primarily in triple negative breast cancer.

== Structure ==
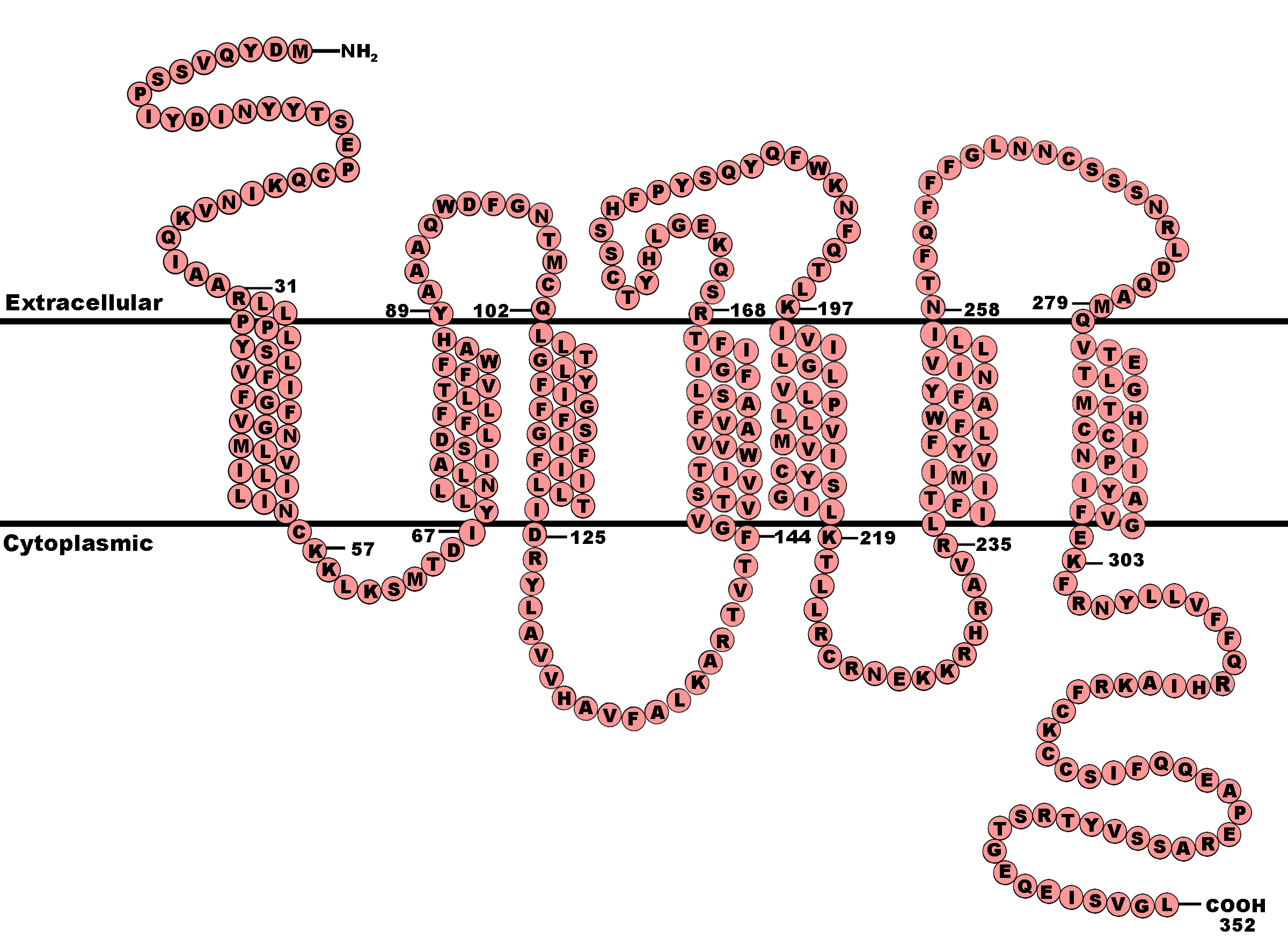
Primary Protein Sequence

CCR5, or CC chemokine receptor 5, is a member of the class A G protein-coupled receptor (GPCR) family characterized by a canonical structure comprising seven transmembrane (7TM) α-helices (labeled I–VII), which are interconnected by three extracellular loops (ECL1–3) and three intracellular loops (ICL1–3). The largest extracellular loop, ECL2, adopts a β-hairpin conformation stabilized by disulfide bonds: one links Cys101 in helix III with Cys178 in ECL2, and another connects Cys20 at the N-terminus to Cys269 in helix VII, constraining the receptor's extracellular architecture. The N-terminal region and extracellular loops are critical for ligand (chemokine) recognition and binding, with the N-terminus forming specific interactions with chemokines such as MIP-1α and RANTES. The transmembrane helices form a deep ligand-binding pocket, accommodating both endogenous chemokines and small molecule inhibitors like maraviroc, with key residues such as Glu283 and Tyr251 mediating ligand interactions through hydrogen bonds and salt bridges. On the intracellular side, helix VI undergoes conformational changes upon activation to facilitate G protein coupling, while helix VIII forms a short α-helix unique to CCR5 compared to related receptors like CXCR4. The overall architecture, including the arrangement of helices and loops, underpins CCR5's roles in immune signaling and as a co-receptor for HIV-1 entry.

== Function ==
The CCR5 protein belongs to the beta chemokine receptors family of integral membrane proteins. It is a G protein–coupled receptor which functions as a chemokine receptor in the CC chemokine group.

CCR5's cognate ligands include CCL3, CCL4 (also known as MIP 1α and 1β, respectively), and CCL3L1. CCR5 furthermore interacts with CCL5 (a chemotactic cytokine protein also known as RANTES).

== Clinical significance ==
It is likely that CCR5 plays a role in inflammatory responses to infection, though its exact role in normal immune function is unclear. Regions of this protein are also crucial for chemokine ligand binding, the functional response of the receptor, and HIV co-receptor activity.

Modulation of CCR5 activity contributes to a non-pathogenic course of infection with simian immunodeficiency virus (SIV) in several African non-human primate species that are long-term natural hosts of SIV and avoid immunodeficiency upon the infection. These regulatory mechanisms include: genetic deletions that abrogate cell surface expression of CCR5, downregulation of CCR5 on the surface of CD4+ T cells, in particular on memory cells, and delayed onset of CCR5 expression on the CD4+ T cells during development.

=== HIV ===
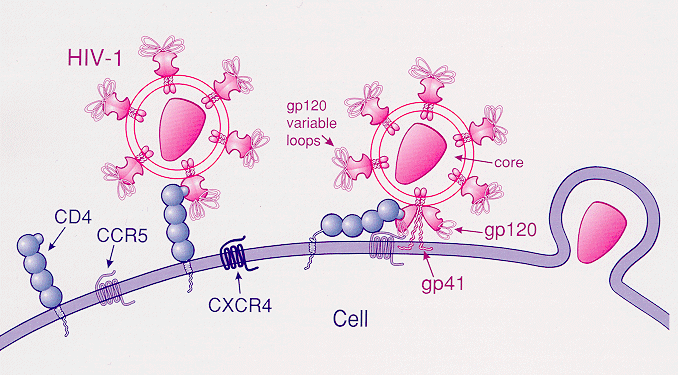
Attachment of HIV to a CD4+ T-helper cell: 1) the gp120 viral protein attaches to CD4. 2) gp120 variable loop attaches to a coreceptor, either CCR5 or CXCR4. 3) HIV enters the cell.

HIV-1 most commonly uses the chemokine receptors CCR5 and/or CXCR4 as co-receptors to enter target immunological cells. These receptors are located on the surface of host immune cells whereby they provide a method of entry for the HIV-1 virus to infect the cell. The HIV-1 envelope glycoprotein structure is essential in enabling the viral entry of HIV-1 into a target host cell. The envelope glycoprotein structure consists of two protein subunits cleaved from a Gp160 protein precursor encoded for by the HIV-1 env gene: the Gp120 external subunit and the Gp41 transmembrane subunit. This envelope glycoprotein structure is arranged into a spike-like structure located on the surface of the virion and consists of a trimer of Gp120-Gp41 hetero-dimers. The Gp120 envelope protein is a chemokine mimic. Though it lacks the unique structure of a chemokine, it is still capable of binding to the CCR5 and CXCR4 chemokine receptors. During HIV-1 infection, the Gp120 envelope glycoprotein subunit binds to a CD4 glycoprotein and a HIV-1 co-receptor expressed on a target cell, forming a heterotrimeric complex. The formation of this complex stimulates the release of a fusogenic peptide, causing the viral membrane to fuse with the membrane of the target host cell. Because binding to CD4 alone can sometimes result in gp120 shedding, gp120 must next bind to co-receptor CCR5 in order for fusion to proceed. The tyrosine-sulfated amino terminus of this co-receptor is the "essential determinant" of binding to the gp120 glycoprotein. The co-receptor also recognizes the V1-V2 region of gp120 and the bridging sheet (an antiparallel, 4-stranded β sheet that connects the inner and outer domains of gp120). The V1-V2 stem can influence "co-receptor usage through its peptide composition as well as by the degree of N-linked glycosylation." Unlike V1-V2 however, the V3 loop is highly variable and thus is the most important determinant of co-receptor specificity. The normal ligands for this receptor, RANTES, MIP-1β, and MIP-1α, are able to suppress HIV-1 infection in vitro. In individuals infected with HIV, CCR5-using viruses are the predominant species isolated during the early stages of viral infection, suggesting that these viruses may have a selective advantage during transmission or the acute phase of disease. Moreover, at least half of all infected individuals harbor only CCR5-using viruses throughout the course of infection.

CCR5 is the primary co-receptor used by gp120 sequentially with CD4. This bind results in gp41, the other protein product of gp160, released from its metastable conformation and inserted into the membrane of the host cell. Although it has not been confirmed, binding of gp120-CCR5 involves two crucial steps: 1) The tyrosine-sulfated amino terminus of this co-receptor is an "essential determinant" of binding to gp120 (as stated previously) 2) Following step 1., there must be reciprocal action (synergy, intercommunication) between gp120 and the CCR5 transmembrane domains.

CCR5 is essential for the spread of the R5-strain of the HIV-1 virus. Knowledge of the mechanism by which this strain of HIV-1 mediates infection has prompted research into the development of therapeutic interventions to block CCR5 function. A number of new experimental HIV drugs, called CCR5 receptor antagonists, have been designed to interfere with binding between the Gp120 envelope protein and the HIV co-receptor CCR5. These experimental drugs include PRO140 (CytoDyn), Vicriviroc (Phase III trials were cancelled in July 2010) (Schering Plough), Aplaviroc (GW-873140) (GlaxoSmithKline) and Maraviroc (UK-427857) (Pfizer). Maraviroc was approved for use by the FDA in August 2007. It is the only one thus far approved by the FDA for clinical use, thus becoming the first CCR5 inhibitor. A problem of this approach is that, while CCR5 is the major co-receptor by which HIV infects cells, it is not the only such co-receptor. It is possible that under selective pressure HIV will evolve to use another co-receptor. However, examination of viral resistance to AD101, molecular antagonist of CCR5, indicated that resistant viruses did not switch to another co-receptor (CXCR4), but persisted in using CCR5: they either bound to alternative domains of CCR5 or to the receptor at a higher affinity. However, because there is still another co-receptor available, it is probable that lacking the CCR5 gene does not make one immune to the virus; it would simply be more challenging for the individual to contract it. Also, the virus still has access to CD4. Unlike CCR5, which is not required (as evidenced by those living healthy lives even when lacking the gene as a result of the delta32 mutation), CD4 is critical in the body's immune defense system. Even without the availability of either co-receptor (even CCR5), the virus can still invade cells if gp41 were to go through an alteration (including its cytoplasmic tail) that resulted in the independence of CD4 without the need of CCR5 and/or CXCR4 as a doorway.

=== Cancer ===
CCR5 inhibitors blocked the migration and metastasis of breast and prostate cancer cells that expressed CCR5, suggesting that CCR5 may function as a new therapeutic target. Recent studies suggest that CCR5 is expressed in a subset of cancer cells with characteristics of cancer stem cells, which are known to drive therapy resistance, and that CCR5 inhibitors enhanced the number of cells killed by current chemotherapy.

Expression of CCR5 is induced in breast and prostate epithelial cells upon transformation. The induction of CCR5 expression promotes cellular invasion, migration, and metastasis. The induction of metastasis involves homing to the metastatic site. CCR5 inhibitors including maraviroc and leronlimab have been shown to block lung metastasis of human breast cancer cell lines. In preclinical studies of immune competent mice CCR5 inhibitors blocked metastasis to the bones and brain. CCR5 inhibitors also reduce the infiltration of tumor associated macrophages. A Phase 1 clinical study of a CCR5 inhibitor in heavily pretreated patients with metastatic colon cancer demonstrated an objective clinical response and reduction in metastatic tumor burden.

=== Stroke ===
Increased levels of CCR5 are part of the inflammatory response to stroke and death. Blocking CCR5 with Maraviroc (a drug approved for HIV) may enhance recovery after stroke.

In the developing brain, chemokine receptors such as CCR5 influence neuronal migration and connection. After stroke, they seem to decrease the number of connection sites on neurons near the damage.

=== CCR5-Δ32 ===
CCR5-Δ32 is a genetic variant characterized by a 32-base-pair deletion in the CCR5 gene, resulting in a nonfunctional receptor that prevents HIV-1 from entering immune cells. Individuals homozygous for this mutation (Δ32/Δ32) lack functional CCR5 on cell surfaces and exhibit strong resistance to HIV-1 infection, while heterozygotes (Δ32/+) show delayed disease progression and reduced viral loads. The allele occurs in approximately 1% of Caucasians, with higher frequencies in Northern Europe, suggesting historical selective pressures such as infectious diseases. Despite its protective role against HIV, CCR5-Δ32 homozygosity may increase susceptibility to flaviviruses like West Nile virus and tick-borne encephalitis due to impaired immune responses. This mutation has also influenced therapeutic strategies, including gene-editing approaches aimed at mimicking its HIV-resistant phenotype.

== See also ==
- Discovery and development of CCR5 receptor antagonists
- Entry inhibitor
- HIV tropism
- Stephen Crohn
- HIV immunity
