= HIV tropism =

Cell type in which HIV infects and replicates

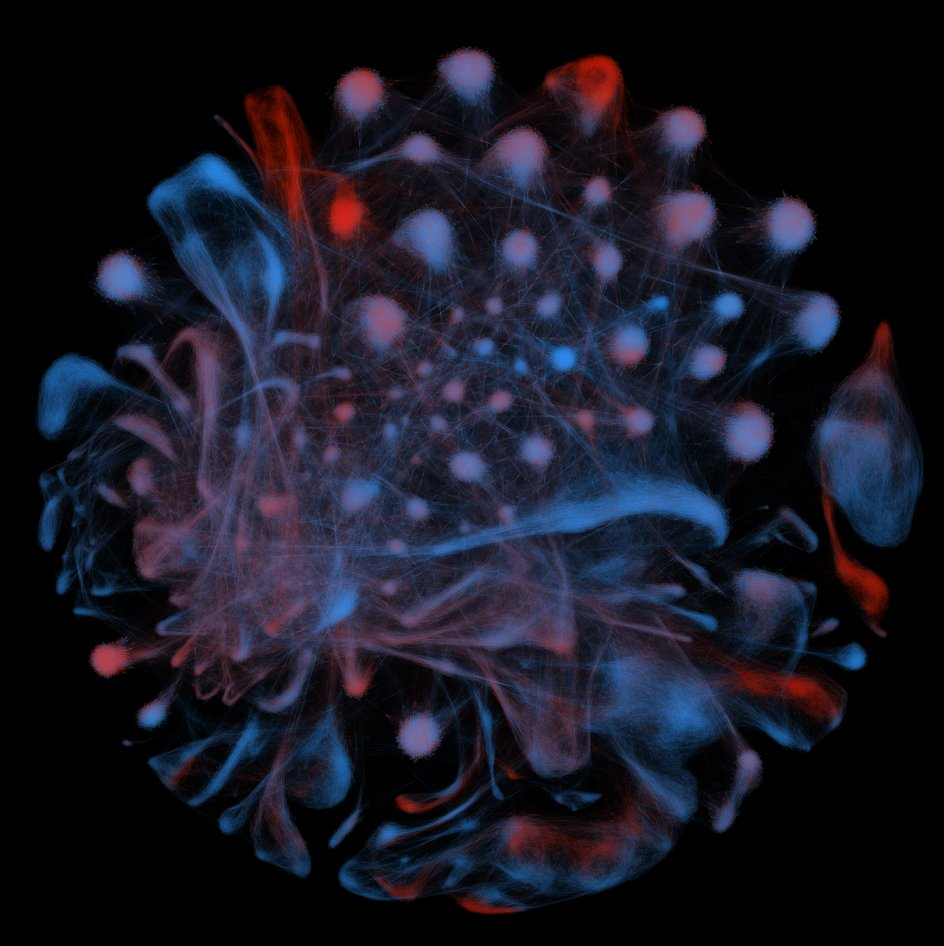
Cells from rhesus macaques, clustered by cell type. Red cells are from monkeys infected with simian-human immunodeficiency virus, while blue cells are from uninfected ones.

HIV tropism refers to the cell type in which the human immunodeficiency virus (HIV) infects and replicates. HIV tropism of a patient's virus is measured by the Trofile assay.

HIV can infect a variety of cells such as CD4+ helper T-cells and macrophages that express the CD4 molecule on their surface. HIV-1 entry to macrophages and T helper cells is mediated not only through interaction of the virion envelope glycoproteins (gp120) with the CD4 molecule on the target cells but also with its chemokine coreceptors.

Macrophage (M-tropic) strains of HIV-1, or non-syncitia-inducing strains (NSI) use the beta-chemokine receptor CCR5 for entry and are thus able to replicate in macrophages and CD4+ T-cells. These strains are now called R5 viruses. The normal ligands for this receptor—RANTES, macrophage inflammatory protein (MIP)-1β and MIP-1α—are able to suppress HIV-1 infection in vitro. This CCR5 coreceptor is used by almost all primary HIV-1 isolates regardless of viral genetic subtype.

T-tropic isolates, or syncitia-inducing (SI) strains replicate in primary CD4+ T-cells as well as in macrophages and use the alpha-chemokine receptor, CXCR4, for entry. These strains are now called X4 viruses. The alpha-chemokine SDF-1, a ligand for CXCR4, suppresses replication of T-tropic HIV-1 isolates. It does this by downregulating the expression of CXCR4 on the surface of these cells.

Viruses that use only the CCR5 receptor are termed R5, those that only use CXCR4 are termed X4, and those that use both, X4R5. However, the use of a coreceptor alone does not explain viral tropism, as not all R5 viruses are able to use CCR5 on macrophages for a productive infection.

== Trofile assay ==
The Trofile assay is a blood test that identifies the tropism of a patient's HIV. A molecular assay, Trofile was developed by Monogram Biosciences for use in HIV treatment. The assay's purpose is to identify the tropism of an individual patient's HIV strain – R5, X4, or a combination of these known as dual/mixed (D/M). The results show whether the patient is infected with virus that enters cells using the R5 co-receptor, the X4 co-receptor, or both (dual/mixed). Patients with strains of HIV that prefer the R5 receptor tend to remain healthy longer than those with the strains that prefer X4. However, over the course of the disease, a patient's viral population may undergo a "tropism switch" from R5 to X4.
