= He Jiankui =

Chinese scientist (born 1984)

- 贺建奎
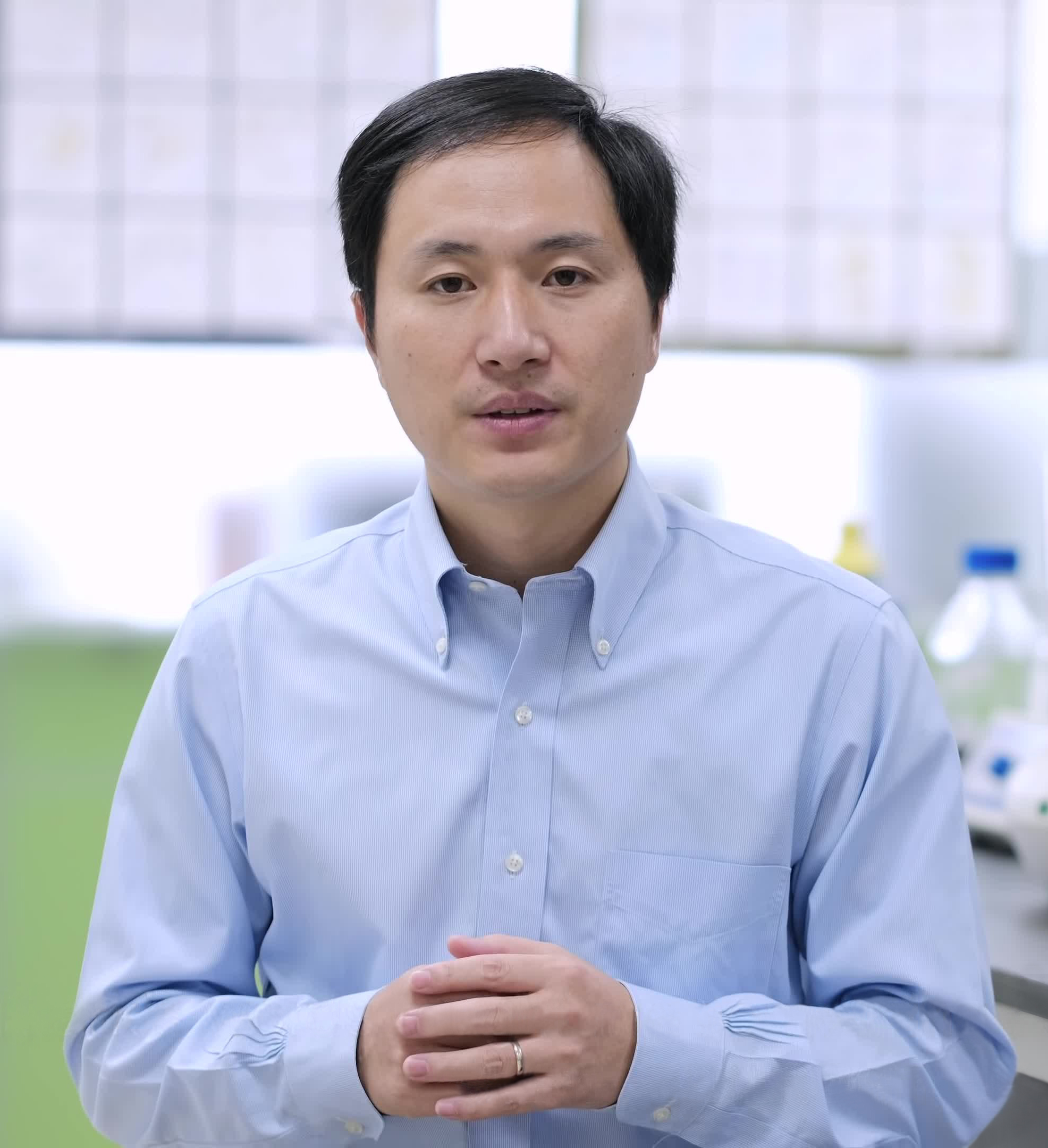
- He in 2018
- Born: 1984 (age 41–42); Xinhua County, Loudi City, Hunan Province, China
- Education: University of Science and Technology of China (BS); Rice University (PhD)
- Known for: He Jiankui genome editing incident
- Scientific career
- Fields: Biophysics
- Workplaces: Stanford University; Southern University of Science and Technology; Wuchang University of Technology
- Thesis: Spontaneous emergence of hierarchy in biological systems (2011)
- Doctoral advisor: Michael W. Deem
- Other academic advisors: Stephen Quake

Chinese name
- Simplified Chinese: 贺建奎
- Traditional Chinese: 賀建奎
Transcriptions
Standard Mandarin
- Hanyu Pinyin: Hè Jiànkuí
- IPA: [xɤ̂ tɕjɛ̂nkʰwěɪ]

He Jiankui (Chinese: 贺建奎; pinyin: Hè Jiànkuí [xɤ̂ tɕjɛ̂nkʰwěɪ] HUH JEE-enn KWAY; born 1984) is a Chinese biophysicist known for his controversial first use of genome editing in humans in 2018. He was listed as one of Time's 100 most influential people of 2019, in the section "Pioneers". At the same time, he was widely condemned as a mad scientist.

He served as associate professor of biology at the Southern University of Science and Technology (SUSTech) in Shenzhen, Guangdong, China, before his dismissal from the university in January 2019. In November 2018, He announced that he had created the first human genetically edited babies, twin girls who were born modified with HIV resistance in October 2018 and were known by their pseudonyms, Lulu and Nana. The announcement was initially praised in the press as a major scientific advancement. However, following scrutiny on how the experiment was executed, he received widespread condemnation from the public and scientific community. An investigation report showed that he raised money for his research to evade government and university research regulations.

His research activities were suspended by the Chinese authorities on 29 November 2018, and he was fired by SUSTech on 21 January 2019. On 30 December 2019, a Chinese district court found He Jiankui guilty of illegal practice of medicine (equivalent to the crime of "practicing medicine without a license" in many other jurisdictions), (Note: He Jiankui's gene editing was deemed medical practice by the court. He had never obtained a medical degree or held a medical license in any jurisdiction. The court also found that he deliberately concealed crucial information and failed to disclose any details or risks associated with the program to the parents of the gene-edited babies. He recruited other people to impersonate the parents to undergo physical examinations. He also evaded government and university regulations through forgery and other means, and committed several other illegal acts.; In its judgment, the court stated that He Jiankui, in pursuit of fame and profit, crossed the bottom line of scientific research and medical ethics by rashly applying gene-editing technology to human assisted reproductive medicine, violating national regulations concerning practicing medicine and research, disrupting medical management order, and the circumstances were serious.) sentencing him to three years in prison with a fine of 3 million yuan. He was released from prison in April 2022.

In February 2023, his application for a Hong Kong work visa was granted but was soon revoked after the Hong Kong Immigration Department launched a criminal investigation against him for making false statements in his application. In September 2023, He was recruited by the Wuchang University of Technology, a private college in Wuhan, Hubei, to serve as the inaugural director for the school's Genetic Medicine Institute.

== Early life and education ==
He was born in Xinhua County, Loudi City, Hunan Province, in 1984. He was the son of a family of poor rice farmers in southeastern China. As a teenager, he built a makeshift laboratory at home and became obsessed with physics in high school.

From 2002 to 2006, He studied quantum physics as an undergraduate at the University of Science and Technology of China and graduated with a bachelor's degree in modern physics in 2006. After winning a scholarship to complete doctoral studies in the United States, He enrolled at Rice University in 2007 and initially studied physics and astronomy there.

He earned his Ph.D. in biophysics in 2010 from Rice University under the supervision of Michael W. Deem after only three years of study. His doctoral dissertation was titled, Spontaneous emergence of hierarchy in biological systems. According to the university, He was an outstanding student who specialized in mathematical modeling and computer simulations. He also served as the president of the Rice Chinese Students and Scholars Association and published three significant papers in Protein Engineering Design and Selection as the lead author while completing his doctorate. Deem recalled in 2010 that He was "a very high-impact student" and added that he was "sure he will be highly successful in his career".

Throughout his early scientific career, He was known as "a smart and ambitious young scientist" and went by the nickname "JK". After he received his doctorate, He went to Stanford University to work on CRISPR/Cas9 gene-editing technique as a postdoctoral fellow with Stephen Quake, a position in which Michael Deem had recommended him. From 2011 to 2012, He did his postdoctoral research at Stanford, where he learned CRISPR/Cas9 gene-editing techniques.

== Career ==
In 2011, He received the Chinese Government Award for Outstanding Self-Financed Students Abroad while still in the United States. Responding to an ad, He returned to China in 2012 under the city of Shenzhen's Peacock Plan and opened a lab at the Southern University of Science and Technology (SUSTech). As part of the program, he was given 1 million yuan (about US$145,000 in 2012) in angel funding, which he used to start biotech and investment companies. He founded Direct Genomics in 2012 in Shenzhen, to develop single-molecule sequencing devices based on patents invented by Quake that had formerly been licensed by Helicos Biosciences. Direct Genomics received 40 million yuan (about US$5,790,000 in 2012) in subsidies from Shenzhen, and raised hundreds of millions yuan more in private investment, but He sold his stake in 2019. He also founded Vienomics Biotech, which offers genome sequencing services for people with cancer. In 2017, He was included in the Chinese government's Thousand Talents Plan. He Jiankui's achievements were widely revered in Chinese media, including China Central Television and the People's Daily which covered his research and described him as "the founding father of third-generation genome editing" during a program celebrating the 19th National Congress of the Chinese Communist Party.

In August 2018, He met with Chinese-American doctor John Zhang to discuss plans to launch a company focused on "genetic medical tourism." The business was to target elite customers, operating out of China or Thailand. The business plans were shelved following He's detainment in November 2018.

He took an unpaid leave from SUSTech starting in February 2018, and began conducting the genome-editing clinical experiment. On 26 November 2018, he announced the birth of gene-edited human babies, Lulu and Nana. Three days later, on 29 November 2018, Chinese authorities suspended all of his research activities, saying that his work was "extremely abominable in nature" and a violation of Chinese law. In December 2018, following public outcry regarding his work, He appeared to have gone missing. SUSTech denied the widespread rumors that he had been detained. On 30 December 2019, the Shenzhen Nanshan District People's Court sentenced He Jiankui to three years in prison and a fine of three million yuan (about US$434,000 in 2019). He Jiankui was released in April 2022 after serving the term.

On 21 February 2023, Hong Kong newspaper Ming Pao reported that He Jiankui said his application for a Hong Kong entry permit through the Top Talent Pass Scheme had been approved. Late that night, the Government of Hong Kong made a public announcement, suggesting that after inspecting the relevant applications, the Immigration Department suspected that He Jiankui had obtained a Hong Kong entry permit by making false statements. The Director of Immigration had declared He Jiankui's entry permit invalid, and a criminal investigation would be conducted.

On 8 September 2023, Wuchang University of Technology (武昌理工学院), a private undergraduate college in Wuhan, Hubei, established the Institute of Genetic Medicine and appointed He Jiankui as the inaugural director and the Dean of the Pharmacology Laboratory.

== Research ==
In 2010, at Rice University, He Jiankui and Michael W. Deem published a paper describing some details of the CRISPR protein; this paper was part of the early work on the CRISPR/Cas9 system, before it had been adopted as a gene editing tool.

In 2017, He gave a presentation at Cold Spring Harbor Laboratory describing work he did at Southern University of Science and Technology (SUSTech), in which he used CRISPR/Cas9 on mice, monkeys, and around 300 human embryos.

In January 2019, scientists in China reported the creation of five identical cloned gene-edited monkeys, using the same cloning technique that was used with Zhong Zhong and Hua Hua – the first ever cloned monkeys – and Dolly the sheep, and the same gene-editing CRISPR/Cas9 technique allegedly used by He in creating the first ever gene-modified human babies Lulu and Nana. The monkey clones were made in order to study several medical diseases.

=== Human gene-editing experiment ===
He Jiankui's announcement

On 25 November 2018, He Jiankui first announced on YouTube that his team successfully created the world's first genome-edited babies, Lulu and Nana. Formally presenting the story at the Second International Summit on Human Genome Editing at the University of Hong Kong (HKU) three days later, he said that the twins were born from genetically modified embryos that were made resistant to M-tropic strains of HIV. His team recruited 8 couples consisting each of HIV-positive father and HIV-negative mother through Beijing-based HIV volunteer group called Baihualin China League. During in vitro fertilization, the sperms were cleansed of HIV. Using CRISPR/Cas9 gene-editing, they introduced a natural mutation CCR5-Δ32 in gene called CCR5, which would confer resistance to M-tropic HIV infection. The People's Daily announced the result as "a historical breakthrough in the application of gene editing technology for disease prevention".

The experiment had recruited couples who wanted to have children; in order to participate, the man had to be HIV-positive and the woman uninfected. At the time, it was not disclosed whether the clinical experiment had received appropriate ethical review from an institutional review board before it started, and it was unclear if the participants had given truly informed consent.

He Jiankui said that he edited the genomes of the embryos using CRISPR/Cas9, specifically targeting a gene, CCR5, that codes for a protein that HIV-1 uses to enter cells. He was trying to create a specific mutation in the gene, (CCR5 Δ32), that few people naturally have and that possibly confers innate resistance to HIV-1, as seen in the case of the Berlin Patient. He said that the girls still carried functional copies of CCR5 along with disabled CCR5 given mosaicism inherent in the present state of the art in germ-line editing. There are forms of HIV which use a different receptor instead of CCR5, and the work that He did could not protect resulting children from those forms of HIV.

He Jiankui said he used a preimplantation genetic diagnosis process on the embryos that were edited, where 3 to 5 single cells were removed and the editing was checked. He said that parents were offered the choice of using edited or unedited embryos.

The twin girls were born by mid-October 2018, according to emails from He to an adviser. According to He, they appeared to be healthy in all respects. When they were born, it was unclear if there might be long-term effects from the gene-editing; He was asked about his plans to monitor the children, and pay for their care should any problems arise, and how their confidentiality and that of their parents could remain protected. The names of the children used in reports, "Lulu" and "Nana", along with the names of their parents, "Mark" and "Grace", are pseudonyms. In February 2019, his claims were reported to have been confirmed by Chinese investigators, according to NPR News.

He Jiankui also said at the Hong Kong meeting that a second mother in his clinical experiment was in the early stages of pregnancy. Although there are no official reports, the baby was expected around August 2019, and the birth was confirmed from the court verdict on 30 December which mentioned that there were three genetically edited babies. The baby was later revealed in 2022 as Amy.

In February 2022, Chinese scientists called for building a special facility to care for and study the three children born with genetically edited genomes or 'CRISPR Babies'. They assert that errors could have occurred in the gene editing process. The scientists believe the children's genomes should be regularly sequenced and tested for 'abnormalities'. The proposal has received pushback from the international medical community citing invasion of the children's privacy and future abuses of power.

=== Gene therapy for rare diseases ===
On 10 November 2022, He announced that he was setting up a new laboratory in Beijing for research on gene therapy for rare genetic diseases, saying on Twitter: "Today, I moved in my new office in Beijing. This is the first day for Jiankui He Lab." On 24 November, he wrote: "Gene therapy in Western countries often costs millions of dollars, which makes many families fall into poverty due to illness. With the support of social philanthropists, we will overcome three to five genetic diseases within two to three years to benefit families with rare diseases." His first plan is to make a gene therapy for Duchenne muscular dystrophy that causes gradual muscle degeneration particularly in boys. He also said on a microblogging site, Weibo, that he had applied for government funding for a DNA synthesiser project, commenting: "[I will] continue the scientific research and serve the country... The biggest use of the DNA synthesiser I plan to make is for information storage. A fingernail-sized piece of synthetic DNA can store the contents of books from the entire national library."

== Human gene-editing controversy ==
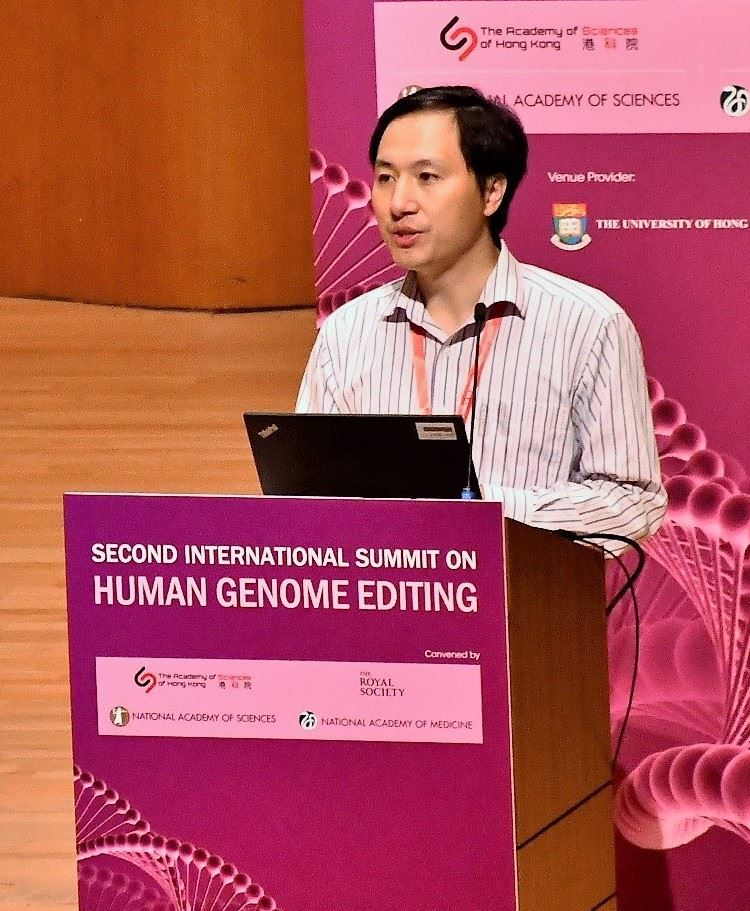
He Jiankui speaking at the Second International Summit on Human Genome Editing

=== Revelation ===
He Jiankui's human gene-editing clinical experiment was conducted without public discussion in the scientific community. It was first made public on 25 November 2018 when Antonio Regalado published a story about the work in MIT Technology Review, based on documents that had been posted earlier that month on the Chinese clinical trials registry. He Jiankui refused to comment on whether the pregnancies were aborted or carried on. It was only after the story was posted that the experiment was revealed in a promotional video on YouTube by He Jiankui and the next day in the Associated Press report. He Jiankui had engaged a public relations firm as well.

=== Reaction ===
He Jiankui's conduct was widely condemned. On 26 November, 122 Chinese scientists issued a joint statement that He's works were unethical, crazy, insane, and "a huge blow to the global reputation and development of Chinese science". Other Chinese scientists and institutions harshly criticized He; an article in Nature stated that concerns about He's conduct were "particularly acute in China, where scientists are sensitive to the country's reputation as the Wild West of biomedical research". An eminent bioethicist, Ren-zong Qiu, speaking at the Second International Summit on Human Genome Editing, commented on He's research as "a practice with the least degree of ethical justifiability and acceptability". Geneticist Eric Topol stated, "This is far too premature ... We're dealing with the operating instructions of a human being. It's a big deal." Nobel Prize-winning biologist David Baltimore considered the work "irresponsible". Developmental biologist Kathy Niakan of the Francis Crick Institute said, "If true...this would be a highly irresponsible, unethical and dangerous use of genome editing technology." Medical ethicist Julian Savulescu of the University of Oxford noted, "If true, this experiment is monstrous." Bioethicist Henry T. Greely of Stanford Law School declared, "I unequivocally condemn the experiment," and later, "He Jiankui's experiment was, amazingly, even worse than I first thought." Nobel prize-winning biochemist Jennifer Doudna, of the University of California, Berkeley, a pioneer of the CRISPR/Cas9 technology, condemned the research. The National Institutes of Health (NIH) of United States announced a statement on 28 November 2018 signed by its Director Francis S. Collins, condemning He and his team for intentionally flouting international ethical norms by doing such irresponsible work, and criticizing that He's "project was largely carried out in secret, the medical necessity for inactivation of CCR5 in these infants is utterly unconvincing, the informed consent process appears highly questionable, and the possibility of damaging off-target effects has not been satisfactorily explored". NIH claims no support for the use of gene-editing technologies in human embryos. The Chinese Academy of Medical Sciences published an announcement in the journal Lancet, stating that they "are opposed to any clinical operation of human embryo genome editing for reproductive purposes in violation of laws, regulations, and ethical norms in the absence of full scientific evaluation", and condemning He for violating relevant ethical regulations and guidelines that have been clearly documented by the Chinese government. They emphasized that the "genome editing of germ cells or early embryos is still in the stage of basic research, ... scientific research institutions and researchers should not undertake clinical operations of genome editing of human germ cells for reproductive purposes, nor should they fund such research", and they will "develop and issue further operational technical and ethical guidelines as soon as possible to guide and standardise relevant research and applications according to the highest scientific and ethical standards." In April 2019, genetics experts from the Chinese Academy of Sciences (CAS) noted, "[We] believe there is no sound scientific reason to perform this type of gene editing on the human germline, and that the behavior of He [Jiankui] and his team represents a gross violation of both the Chinese regulations and the consensus reached by the international science community. We strongly condemn their actions as extremely irresponsible, both scientifically and ethically."

Others were less critical of He's experiment. George Church, a geneticist at Harvard University, defended some aspects of the experiment and said gene editing for HIV resistance was "justifiable" since HIV is "a major and growing public health threat", but questioned the decision of this project to allow one of the embryos to be used in a pregnancy attempt, since the use of that embryo suggests that the researchers' "main emphasis was on testing editing rather than avoiding this disease". Arthur Caplan, bioethicist at the New York University School of Medicine, said that engineering human genes is inevitable and, although there are concerns of creating "designer babies", medical researchers are more interested in using the technology to prevent and treat diseases, much like the type of experiments performed by He. Carl Zimmer compared the reaction to He's human gene editing experiment to the initial reactions and subsequent debate over mitochondrial replacement therapy (MRT), and the eventual regulatory approval of MRT in the United Kingdom.

The Southern University of Science and Technology stated that He Jiankui had been on unpaid leave since February 2018, and his research was conducted outside of their campus; the university and his department said they were unaware of the research project and said it was inviting international experts to form an independent committee to investigate the incident, and would release the results to the public. Local authorities and the Chinese government also opened investigations.

As of news reported on 28 December 2018, He was sequestered in a university apartment and under guard. According to news reported on 7 January 2019, he could face severe consequences. William Hurlbut, Stanford University neuroscientist and bioethicist, reported that he was in contact with He who was staying in a university apartment in Shenzhen "by mutual agreement" and was free to leave; often visiting the gym and taking walks with his wife. Nonetheless, He may have been under some form of surveillance.

On 25 February 2019, some suggested the Chinese government might have helped fund the CRISPR babies experiment, at least in part. Later reports showed that the fund for He's project was entirely raised by himself to evade regulation, and no Chinese government funds were involved.

=== Provincial investigation report ===
An investigating task force set up by the Guangdong Provincial Health Commission released a preliminary report on January 21, 2019. The report stated that He Jiankui had defied government bans and conducted the research in the pursuit of personal fame and gain. The report confirmed that He had recruited eight couples to participate in his experiment, resulting in two pregnancies, one of which gave birth to the gene-edited twin girls in November 2018. The babies are now under medical supervision. The report further said He had made forged ethical review papers in order to enlist volunteers for the procedure, and had raised his own funds deliberately evading oversight, and organized a team that included some overseas members to carry out the illegal project. Officials from the investigation said that He, as well as other relevant personnel and organizations, will receive punishment per relevant laws and regulations, and those who are suspected of committing crimes will be charged.

=== Court ruling ===
On 30 December 2019, the Shenzhen City Nanshan District People's Court found He Jiankui guilty of illegal practice of medicine (equivalent to the crime of "practicing medicine without a license" in many other jurisdictions), sentencing him to three years in prison with a fine of CN¥3 million (about US$434,000). According to the district court's judgment, He Jiankui's gene editing was deemed medical practice by the court. He had never obtained a medical degree or held a medical license in any jurisdiction. The court also found that he deliberately concealed crucial information and failed to disclose any details or risks associated with the program to the parents of the gene-edited babies. He recruited other people to impersonate the parents to undergo physical examinations. He also evaded government and university regulations through forgery and other means, and committed several other illegal acts. In its judgment, the court stated that He Jiankui, in pursuit of fame and profit, crossed the bottom line of scientific research and medical ethics by rashly applying gene-editing technology to human assisted reproductive medicine, violating national regulations concerning practicing medicine and research, disrupting medical management order, and the circumstances were serious.

His collaborators received less penalty: Zhang Renli of the Guangdong Academy of Medical Sciences and Guangdong General Hospital, a two-year prison sentence and a 1-million RMB (about US$145,000) fine, and Qin Jinzhou of the Southern University of Science and Technology, an 18-month prison sentence and a 500,000 RMB (about US$72,000) fine. The three were found guilty of having "forged ethical review documents and misled doctors into unknowingly implanting gene-edited embryos into two women."

=== Aftermath ===
The SUSTech announced a statement on its website on 21 January 2019 that He Jiankui had been fired.

In May 2019, lawyers in China reported, in light of the purported creation by He Jiankui of the first gene-edited humans, the drafting of regulations that anyone manipulating the human genome by gene-editing techniques would be held responsible for any related adverse consequences. In December 2019, MIT Technology Review reported an overview of the controversy to date, including excerpts of the unpublished research manuscript.

In February 2019, scientists reported that the gene modification made in Lulu and Nana likely also confers cognitive benefits. While health journalist Julia Belluz has speculated in Vox that this may have been a motivation for He Jiankui to work on modifying this gene, Antonio Regalado of MIT Technology Review found no evidence that He Jiankui had interest in this area.

In 2019, the World Health Organization (WHO) has launched a global registry to track research on human genome editing, after a call to halt all work on genome editing.

== Personal life ==
As of 2025, He Jiankui is active on X, formerly known as Twitter, making English-language posts that are mostly about his genetic research. His posts had various reactions and adaptations on the platform.

In July 2025, He Jiankui revealed on social media that he has two daughters.

In April 2025, He Jiankui, 41, married Cathy Tie, 29, shortly after naming his new company "Cathy Medicine". Tie declined to say if He and she were legally married, but emphasized that her relationship with He was genuine. Three months later, Tie announced on X that they had separated and later confirmed that she had not been legally married to He.

== In popular culture ==
- He Jiankui's life and his CRISPR experiment were presented in the documentary Make People Better, released in 2022. The film described, "A Chinese scientist disappears after developing the first designer babies, shocking the world and the entire scientific community, but an investigation shows he may not have been alone in his experiment to create 'better' human beings." Directed by Cody Sheehy, the expert panel included Antonio Regalado and Benjamin Hurlbut of the Arizona State University. The documentary originated from a Rhumbline Media project on genetic engineering titled Code of the Wild: The Nature of Us started in 2018 by Sheehy and Samira Kiani, a biotechnologist at Arizona State University.
- His account is depicted in The CRISPR Generation: The Story of the World's First Gene-Edited Babies, a 2019 book by Kiran Musunuru, a cardiologist at the University of Pennsylvania.
- His story is narrated in the 2020 book The Mutant Project: Inside the Global Race to Genetically Modify Humans, written by Eben Kirksey, an anthropologist at the University of Oxford.
- A documentary book CRISPR People: The Science and Ethics of Editing Humans, written by Henry Greely, was published in 2021.
- In the 2022 manga "Rikujou Jieitai Tokumu Chouhou Kikan - Beppan no Inu", a fictitious version of He Jiankui is responsible for the creation of super soldiers.

== See also ==
- Assisted reproduction technology
- Human Nature (2019 CRISPR film documentary)
- Unnatural Selection (2019 TV documentary)
