= Human Nature (2019 film) =

2019 documentary film

- Film documentary cover
- Directed by: Adam Bolt
- Written by: Adam Bolt, Regina Sobel
- Produced by: Greg Boustead, Elliot Kirschner, Dan Rather, Sarah Goodwin, Meredith DeSalazar
- Cinematography: Derek Reich
- Edited by: Regina Sobel, Steve Tyler
- Music by: Keegan DeWitt
- Production companies: News and Guts Films, The Wonder Collaborative
- Release date: March 10, 2019 (SXSW)
- Running time: 107 minutes
- Country: United States
- Language: English
- Box office: $5,834

Human Nature is a 2019 documentary film directed by Adam Bolt and written by Adam Bolt and Regina Sobel. Producers of the film include Greg Boustead, Elliot Kirschner and Dan Rather.

The film describes the gene editing process of CRISPR (an acronym for "Clustered Regularly Interspaced Short Palindromic Repeats"), and premiered in Austin, Texas at the South by Southwest film conference and festival on March 10, 2019.

== Synopsis ==
Human Nature is a film documentary which presents an in-depth description of the gene editing process of CRISPR, and its possible implications. The film includes the perspective of the scientists who invented the process, and of the genetic engineers who are applying the process. The CRISPR process, a 2013 breakthrough in biology, provides a way of controlling the basic genetic processes of life.

In addition, the film documentary considers several relevant questions including, How will this new gene-editing ability change our relationship with nature? and, What will this new gene-editing ability mean for human evolution? The film, in beginning to answer such questions, presents a review of the distant past and takes an educated look into the future.

The film features the story of David Sanchez, a young man with sickle cell disease. He is first featured in the hospital, sharing his experience as he gets a red blood cell transfusion. This treatment is currently one of the only available for people with sickle cell to help manage severe pain crises. Geneticists Tshaka Cunningham, Ph.D. and Matt Porteus, M.D. discuss the prospect of using CRISPR to treat sickle cell disease at its genetic source. Porteus is set to start a clinical trial at Stanford University using CRISPR to treat sickle cell disease. At the end of the film, Sanchez speaks specifically about the role that sickle cell has had in shaping who he is today, stating “I don’t think I’d be me.”

== Participants ==
The documentary film includes the following notable participants (alphabetized by last name):

- David Baltimore – American biologist
- Matthew Porteus – American researcher
- Jill Banfield – American researcher
- Rodolphe Barrangou – American researcher
- Alta Charo – American bioethicist
- Emmanuelle Charpentier – French microbiologist
- George M. Church – American geneticist
- Tshaka Cunningham – American researcher
- George Q. Daley – American hematologist
- Jennifer Doudna – American biochemist
- Hank Greely – American lawyer
- Ian Hodder – British archaeologist
- Stephen Hsu – American physicist
- Francisco Mojica – Spanish microbiologist
- Ryan Phelan – Australian journalist
- Antonio Regalado
- David Sanchez
- Dolores Sanchez
- Fyodor Urnov – Russian geneticist
- Ethan Weiss
- Palmer Weiss
- Ruthie Weiss
- Luhan Yang--->
- Fyodor Urnov – Russian-born biomedical researcher
- Feng Zhang – American biochemist

== Reviews and criticism ==
According to film reviewer Devindra Hardawar, writing in Engadget, the film is "a fascinating primer about what led to the discovery of the [CRISPR] tool, and an exploration of the role it may have in our society. It's hopeful about CRISPR's ability to help us fix diseases that have plagued humans for millennia, while also questioning if we're ready to make genetic changes that'll affect us for generations to come." Reviewer Danielle Solzman writes, "There’s a lot of science involved here. I can't stop but grow cautious when it comes to the Jurassic Park [film] comparisons. At the same time, I also want scientists to push for finding cures to cancer, MS, sickle cell anemia, etc. Maybe gene editing is one possible solution as Human Nature shows." Film reviewer Sam Machkovech of Ars Technica asks, "[Does this film describe] the future of health? The future of a ... nightmare? By anchoring both of those extremes with a funny, human touch, Human Nature made me feel comfortable with a landing point somewhere closer to the middle." Reviewer Sean Boelman notes, "Overall, Human Nature [is] an interesting and effective documentary. If you are a fan of science-oriented films, this is not one you will want to miss."

== See also ==
- Brief Answers to the Big Questions,
  2018 Stephen Hawking book
- Glossary of genetics
- Hachimoji DNA
- He Jiankui
- Lulu and Nana controversy
- Make People Better (2022 documentary)
- Synthetic biology
- Unnatural Selection (2019 TV documentary)
