= NCT =

NCT may stand for:

== Tests ==
- National Car Test, Ireland, a roadworthiness test for cars
- National Curriculum Tests, in the English education system

== Organizations and companies ==
- Nashville Children's Theatre, the oldest professional children's theatre company in the United States
- National Comedy Theatre, an improvisational theatrical company in the United States
- Niagara College Teaching Winery, a college in Ontario, Canada, which produces wine sold locally
- Nobel Charitable Trust, a charity set up by members of the Swedish Nobel family
- National Childbirth Trust, a UK-based charity related to pregnancy, childbirth and early parenthood
- Nottingham City Transport, a bus operator in Nottingham, England
- North Carolina Theatre, a semi-professional theatre company in North Carolina
- North County Times, a newspaper in northern San Diego County, California
- Newark Castle railway station, in Newark-on-Trent, United Kingdom
- The ICAO airline code for NokScoot, a defunct airline in Bangkok, Thailand
- Northern California TRACON, an air traffic control facility in Mather, California

== Locations ==
- National Capital Territory of Delhi, the official name of the city and the union territory of Delhi, India
- North Country Trail, a United States National Scenic Trail running from New York to North Dakota

== Science ==
- Nuclear Compton Telescope, a balloon-borne gamma-ray detector
- Nicastrin, a protein component of the gamma secretase enzyme complex
- Nocturnal clitoral tumescence, a spontaneous swelling of the clitoris during sleep or when waking up
- Neutron Capture Therapy, a type of cancer treatment
- Nitrocellulose tubular, a type of smokeless powder
- Non-Contact Tonometry, a medical test that estimates fluid pressure inside the eye

== Religion ==
- New Covenant theology, a form of Christian theology

== Economics ==
- Niue Consumption Tax, a tax in the South Pacific island nation Niue

== Music ==
- NCT (group), or Neo Culture Technology, a South Korean boy band
  - NCT U, the first sub-unit of NCT
  - NCT 127, the second sub-unit of NCT
  - NCT Dream, the third sub-unit of NCT
  - NCT Wish, the fifth and final sub-unit of NCT
- Nonchord tone, or non-harmonic tone, tones not analyzed as part of the chord
