= Niagara College =

College in Ontario, Canada

Coordinates: 43°4′46.14″N 79°5′25.92″W

Niagara College of Applied Arts and Technology
- Motto: Applied Dreams
- Type: Public college
- Established: 1967
- Affiliations: CCAA, ACCC, AUCC, CBIE
- Chair: Lora Tisi
- Vice-president: Pam Skinner, Marc Nantel, Fiona Allen, Sean Coote, Chris McGrath, Gord Arbreau
- President: Sean Kennedy
- Undergraduates: 2025: 6,202 FTEs
- Location: Welland; Niagara-on-the-Lake; Toronto, Ontario, Canada
- Campus: Urban/Rural
- Colours: Blue & White
- Nickname: Knights
- Mascot: "Knightro" the Knight
- Website: niagaracollege.ca

The Niagara College of Applied Arts and Technology (frequently shortened to Niagara College and branded as Niagara College Canada) is a public College of Applied Arts and Technology partnered with the private Toronto School of Management within the Niagara Region and the city of Toronto in Southern Ontario, Canada. As of 2023 Niagara has over 11,000 international students on study permits, among the highest in Canada.

The college has three campuses within Ontario: the Welland Campus in Welland, the Daniel J. Patterson Campus/Niagara-on-the-Lake Campus in Niagara-on-the-Lake, and the Toronto School of Management Partnership Campus in Toronto. Additionally it has international operations across Asia, including multiple campuses in Saudi Arabia under its Niagara College KSA subsidiary, and the Canada-China College in Wuhan, China. Their Maid of the Mist Campus in Niagara Falls closed in 2018.

The college has 12,500 full-time students, including about 4,000 international students from a variety of countries. It offers approximately 100 post-secondary diploma, baccalaureate degrees and advanced level programs. Niagara College employs 291 faculty, 89 administration staff and 224 support staff and has graduated more than 50,000 students.

== History ==
On May 21, 1965, Ontario led the way for colleges of applied arts and technology with the creation of its college system. In 1967, Niagara College's Welland Campus was established in response to the provincial initiative to create many such institutions, providing career-oriented diploma and certificate courses, as well as continuing education programs.

In 1998, Niagara College opened its Niagara-on-the-Lake Campus in Niagara-on-the-Lake, Ontario. In 2004, Niagara College's hospitality, tourism and culinary programs moved from the Maid of the Mist Campus to new facilities at the Niagara-on-the-Lake Campus. In 2002, Niagara College launched its Niagara College Teaching Winery, the first commercial teaching winery in Canada, and in 2011 it launched the Niagara College Teaching Brewery, also the first of its kind in Canada. Today, the culinary programs, teaching winery and teaching brewery are all part of Niagara College's Canadian Food and Wine Institute. In the early 19th century, the Niagara-on-the-Lake campus was the site of the Black Swamp, through which Laura Secord traveled on her way to warn British Lieutenant FitzGibbon of a surprise attack by American forces.

In response to the rapid growth of Niagara's tourism sector and the anticipated demand for thousands of new workers, the college established the Tourism Industry Development Centre (TIDC). Housed on the Maid of the Mist Campus in Niagara Falls, the TIDC serves as a dedicated industry development and training resource for the hospitality and tourism sector. In 2007, the Ontario Street Site was added for the expanding Health & Community Studies programs.

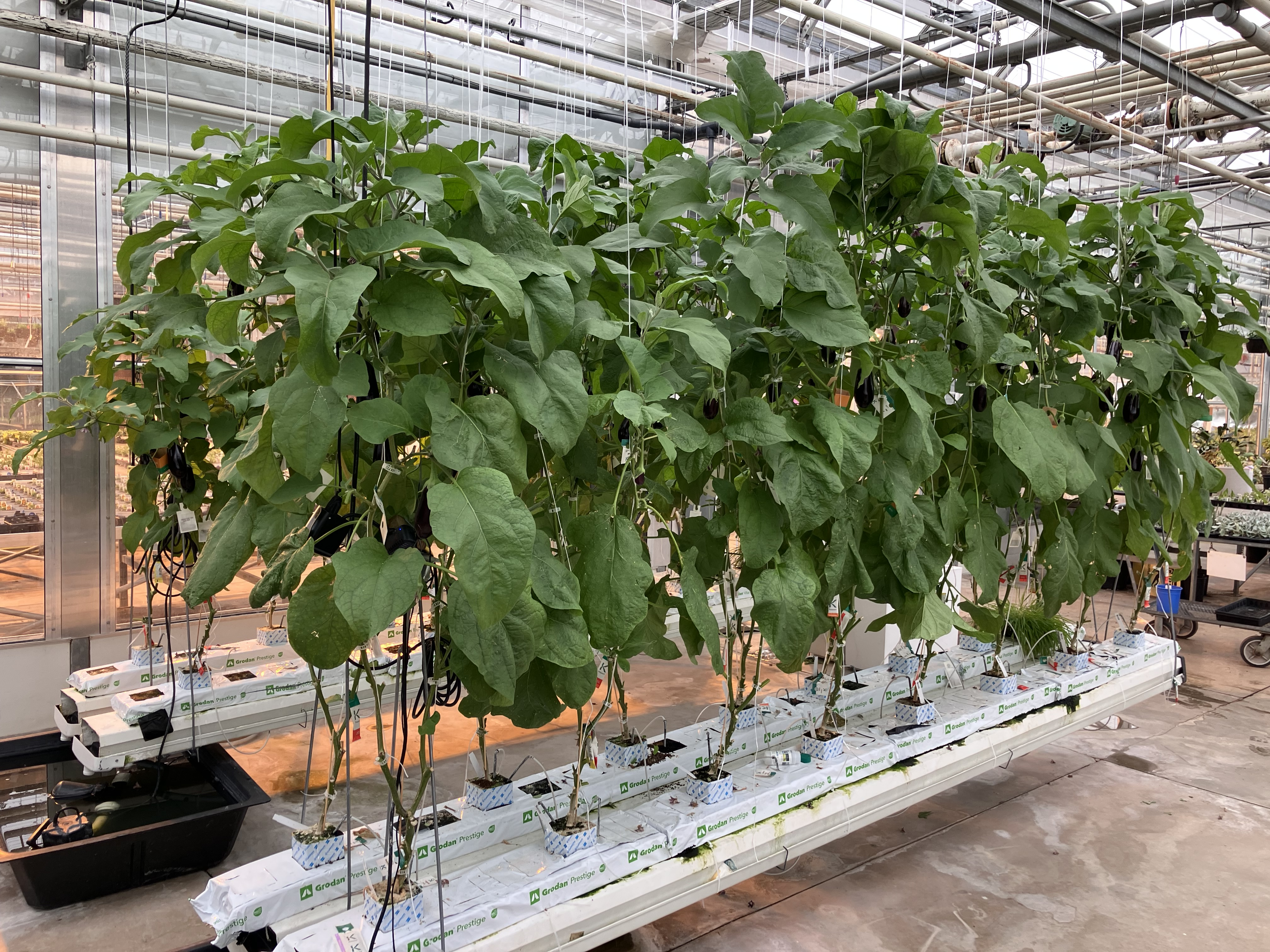
Eggplants in Aquaponics at the NC Greenhouse

In 2008, Niagara College embarked on a $90 million campus redevelopment as part of the college's overall master plan, which included significant improvements and additions to the Welland and Niagara-on-the-Lake Campuses. The redevelopment project was designed to increase capacity in programs that serve key industries in Niagara, including skilled trades, technology, winery and viticulture and hospitality and tourism, while providing much-needed improvements to aging facilities. The project was also a response to the college's growth, including a 10.1 percent increase in total enrolment for the fall 2008 term.

Construction at the Welland Campus included a 15,000-square-foot (1,400 m^{2}) expansion to the Rankin Technology Centre, as well as a new Academic Wing, a Library and Learning Commons, a two-story Athletics Centre, a Student Centre and the $40 million Applied Health Institute (AHI), funded by the federal and provincial governments under the Knowledge Infrastructure Program (KIP). The facility brought all of Niagara College's health programs into one complex and created space for new programs and students. The AHI includes classrooms and simulation labs, a dental clinic, community health clinic and a 350-seat auditorium.

At the Niagara-on-the-Lake Campus, the project included construction of a Wine Visitor + Education Centre, which integrates academic programming, facilities for the unique Niagara College Teaching Winery and an educational centre for students, industry and visitors. The project also saw an expansion of culinary facilities and the construction of the Niagara College Teaching Brewery. The project was completed in spring 2011.

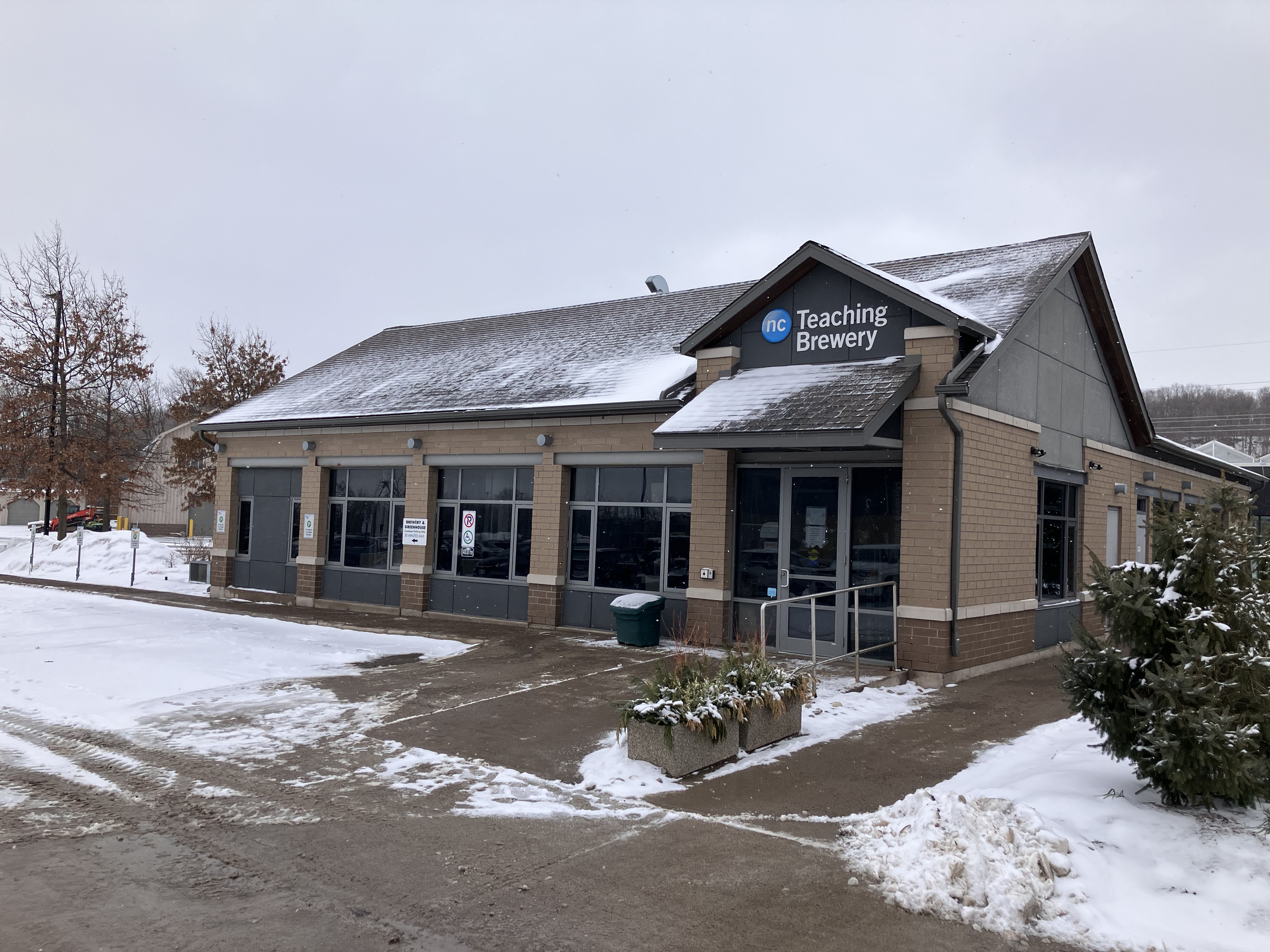
The Teaching Brewery building of Niagara College

In 2015 Niagara College was the subject of a class-action lawsuit from international students. The lawsuit claimed students were misled into thinking their Niagara College diploma qualified them for work permits.

The Learning Commons was renamed the Eva M. Lewis Learning Commons and Library in April 2016 following a $2.6 million donation from the estate of Eva M. Lewis. It was the largest private donation in the history of the school. 2016 saw Canadian higher-education institutions called out for abandoning academic ethics and standards to enrol foreign students.

In 2018 Niagara College enrolled its largest ever cohort of international students, 4,100 out of 11,000 total. Roughly 3,000 were from India, hundreds of whom could not function academically in English. The situation led to a crisis that forced hundreds of retests and led IDP Education to raise concerns regarding Niagara College's testing methods. According to college instructors, many of the students being retested dropped out. However, no instructors shared their name publicly out of fear of reprisal from the school's administration.

Following the admissions scandal, Niagara College announced they were reviewing their admissions criteria in 2019. Academic industry insiders insisted the what Niagara College had done, was only different than other colleges, in that they were caught. Late that year Niagara College settled the class-action lawsuit filed by their international students for $3 million.

In 2021, Niagara College partnered with Toronto School of Management (TSoM) to provide four business and hospitality programs at TSoM's campus.”

In 2024, with 475 asylum claims between Niagara College (455) and Toronto School of Management (20), the college was reported to be the second largest source of student asylum claims in Canada.

== Canadian Food and Wine Institute ==
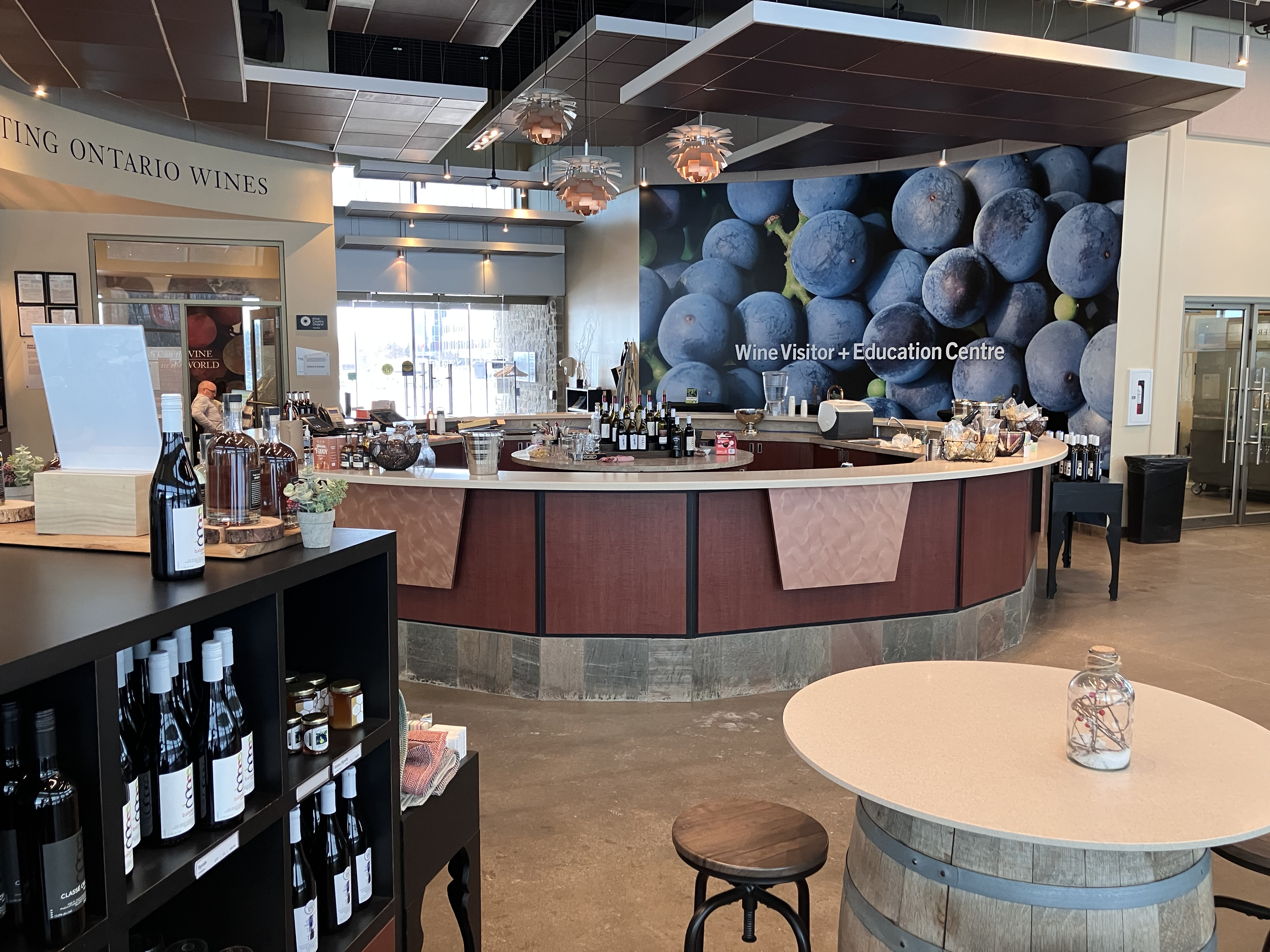
The tasting room of Niagara College Teaching Winery

Niagara College's Canadian Food and Wine Institute (CFWI) provides food, wine and beer education and training for students, employers and consumers. The institute specializes in Canadian regional cuisine with a focus on culinary arts and science, wine and beer sciences, food technology, and research. It has three major learning enterprises including Benchmark restaurant, the Niagara College Teaching Winery and the Niagara College Teaching Brewery—Canada's first teaching brewery. This is all located at the 114-acre Niagara-on-the-Lake Campus, which also houses 40 acres of teaching vineyards, a greenhouse, chef's gardens, horticultural features across campus and the ecological initiatives along the Wetland Ridge Trail (which joins the Bruce Trail of the adjacent UN designated world biosphere reserve of the Niagara Escarpment).

== Active Campuses ==
The college is divided into four campuses. They are:

=== Welland Campus ===
This campus offers a range of services and activities, including a fitness and sports centre, student activity centre, open computer labs, campus store, library and cafeteria. The Welland Campus has programs in broadcasting, acting for film and television, communications, health and community studies, early childhood education, and policing. It also has the Technology Skill Centre, the Welland YMCA, the Niagara Children's Safety Village, and the Centre for Policing and Community Safety Studies, which is the product of a partnership between the college and the Niagara Regional Police Service.

=== Daniel J. Patterson Campus ===
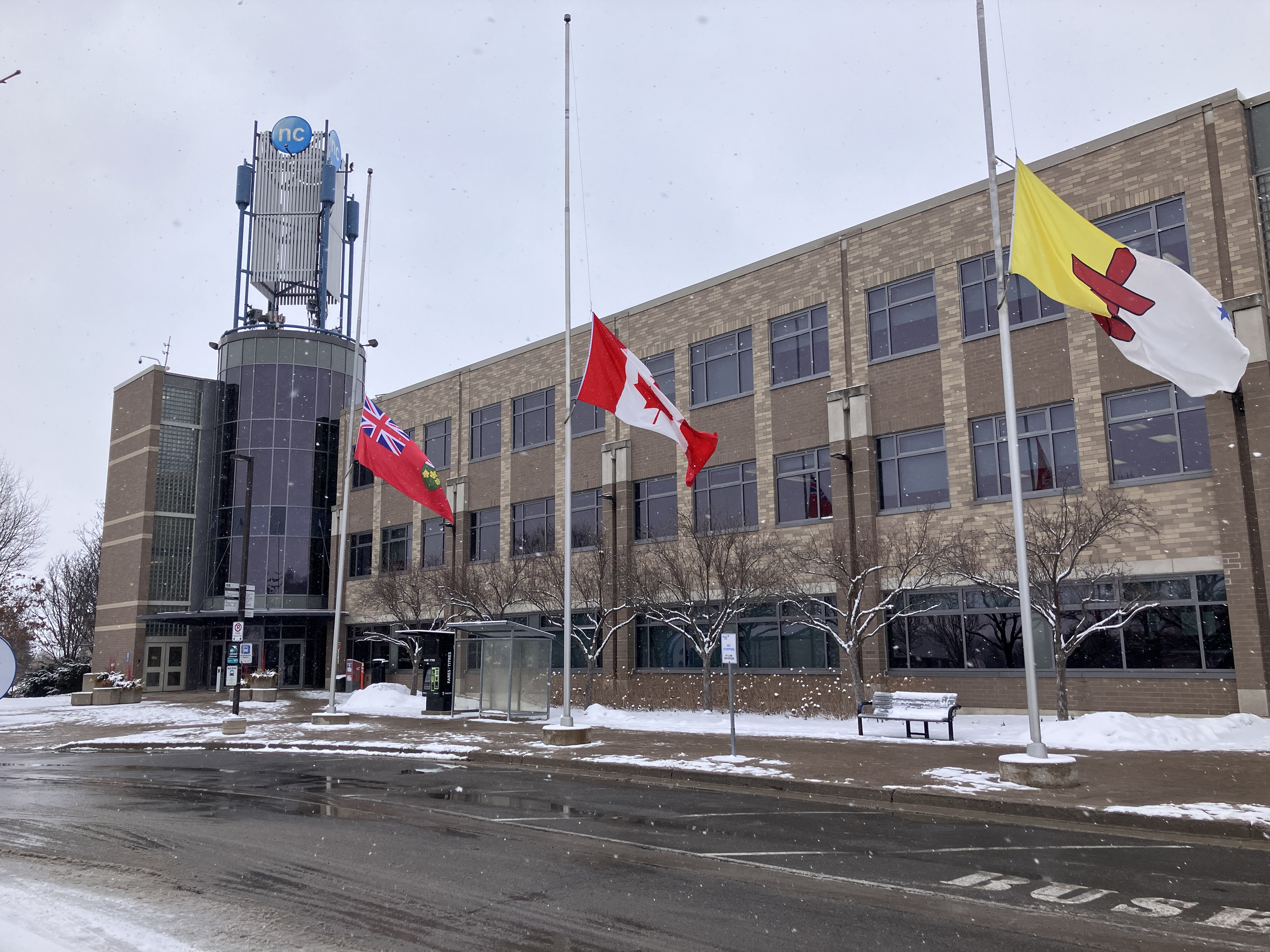
Daniel J. Patterson Campus of Niagara College in 2026

The Daniel J. Patterson Campus (previously known as the Niagara-On-The-Lake Campus, and before that as the Glendale Campus), opened in 1998, is located at Glendale Avenue and the Queen Elizabeth Way. The facility is three-storeys tall and is located at the base of the Niagara Escarpment. It has a greenhouse centre, the Niagara Waters Spa, the Niagara Culinary Institute, and the Niagara College Teaching Winery. The Daniel J. Patterson campus also has three on-site vineyards and a wine sensory laboratory.

The campus was renamed in 2019 to honor its retiring president, Daniel J. Patterson.

=== Toronto School of Management Partnership Campus ===
In February 2021, Niagara College Canada and the Toronto School of Management partnered to offer some of Niagara College's programs at TSoM's campus in the city of Toronto, Ontario as a part of the Global University Systems (GUS) group.

Niagara College Toronto is located within the Downtown Toronto. It is operated by Toronto School of Management (TSoM) under a Public College Private Partnership (PCPP) agreement with Niagara College Canada of Applied Arts & Technology.

=== Taif Campus ===
The college is currently establishing a "national centre of excellence" in tourism, hospitality and business innovation in the Kingdom of Saudi Arabia. Programs such as business and management studies, culinary studies and hospitality and tourism studies are offered to male Saudi citizens. A special foundation year studies program is designed to set students up for success by teaching them English communications, entrepreneurship and computer.

== Closed Campus ==
=== Maid of the Mist Campus ===
The Maid of the Mist Campus previously housed the Tourism Industry Development Centre, a hub of services dedicated to the Niagara Region's hospitality and tourism industry, and the Job Connect Program Niagara College Jobs and Training. The Kerrio Dining room was open to the public Thursdays and Fridays during the school year. Lunch and dinners were prepared by the Level I Cook Apprentice students under the supervision of the chefs of Niagara Culinary Institute. There was also a salon for the hairstyling programs.

=== Canada-China College Campus ===
The Canada-China College located in Wuhan, China was a partnership between Niagara College and Wuchang University of Technology. It was established in 2017 and is no longer active..

== Athletics ==
Niagara College is a member of the Ontario Colleges and Canadian Colleges Athletic Associations (OCAA & CCAA). Their sports teams are referred to as the Niagara Knights.

Niagara College Varsity Athletic programs include:

- Men's and Women's Basketball
- Men's and Women's Curling
- Men's and Women's Golf
- Men's and Women's Soccer
- Men's and Women's Volleyball

In the fall of 2010, the Welland Campus opened a new athletic centre with two gymnasiums, a fitness centre, multi-purpose rooms and additional locker facilities. It also has a softball diamond, an outdoor running track (0.6 km), two-rink outdoor hockey facility and a soccer/football field.

The Niagara-on-the-Lake features a gymnasium and fitness room.

The intramural league programs and activities include ball hockey, basketball, badminton, touch football, basketball, co-ed volleyball, indoor soccer, outdoor ball hockey, soccer and ice hockey.

In spring 2011, Niagara College hosted the CCAA Women's Basketball National Championships, and in spring 2013, Niagara College hosted the CCAA Men's Volleyball National Championships.

== University transfers ==
University Transfers Niagara College has a number of Joint Programs with the several institutions:

- Brock University, Canada
- Niagara University, New York State, United States
- Sanda University, China
- University of Santo Tomas, Chile

Niagara College has developed many degree completion agreements with universities and colleges in Canada and around the world. Niagara College has partnering institutions in Ontario, Alberta, British Columbia and New Brunswick. International university partners can be found in New York State, Michigan, New Hampshire, Australia, United Arab Emirates and Chile.

== Broadcasting ==
Niagara College operates the radio station CRNC, which broadcasts as an Internet radio stream from the Welland Campus on Woodlawn Road/First Avenue in Welland, Ontario. The station is branded as The Heat, Niagara's New Rock. The station's programming is produced by students in the school's Broadcasting program.

== Scholarships ==
The college is a member of Project Hero, a scholarship program cofounded by General (Ret'd) Rick Hillier, for the families of fallen Canadian Forces members.

== Notable alumni ==
- Edward Burtynsky, photographer
- John Campea, host of The John Campea Show
- Shirley Coppen, politician
- Dan Dunleavy, sportscaster
- Christel Haeck, politician
- Peter Kormos, politician
- Bernie McNamee, journalist
- Mark Montefiore, film and television producer
- Priyanka, television personality and drag queen

== Staff Unionization ==
Full-time faculty at Niagara College (Canada) are represented by the Ontario Public Service Employees Union (OPSEU) local 242. The union office is located in the Welland Campus' Black Walnut building.

== See also ==
- Canadian government scientific research organizations
- Canadian industrial research and development organizations
- Canadian Interuniversity Sport
- Canadian university scientific research organizations
- Higher education in Ontario
- List of colleges in Ontario
- List of universities in Ontario
