= He Jiankui affair =

2018 scientific and bioethical controversy

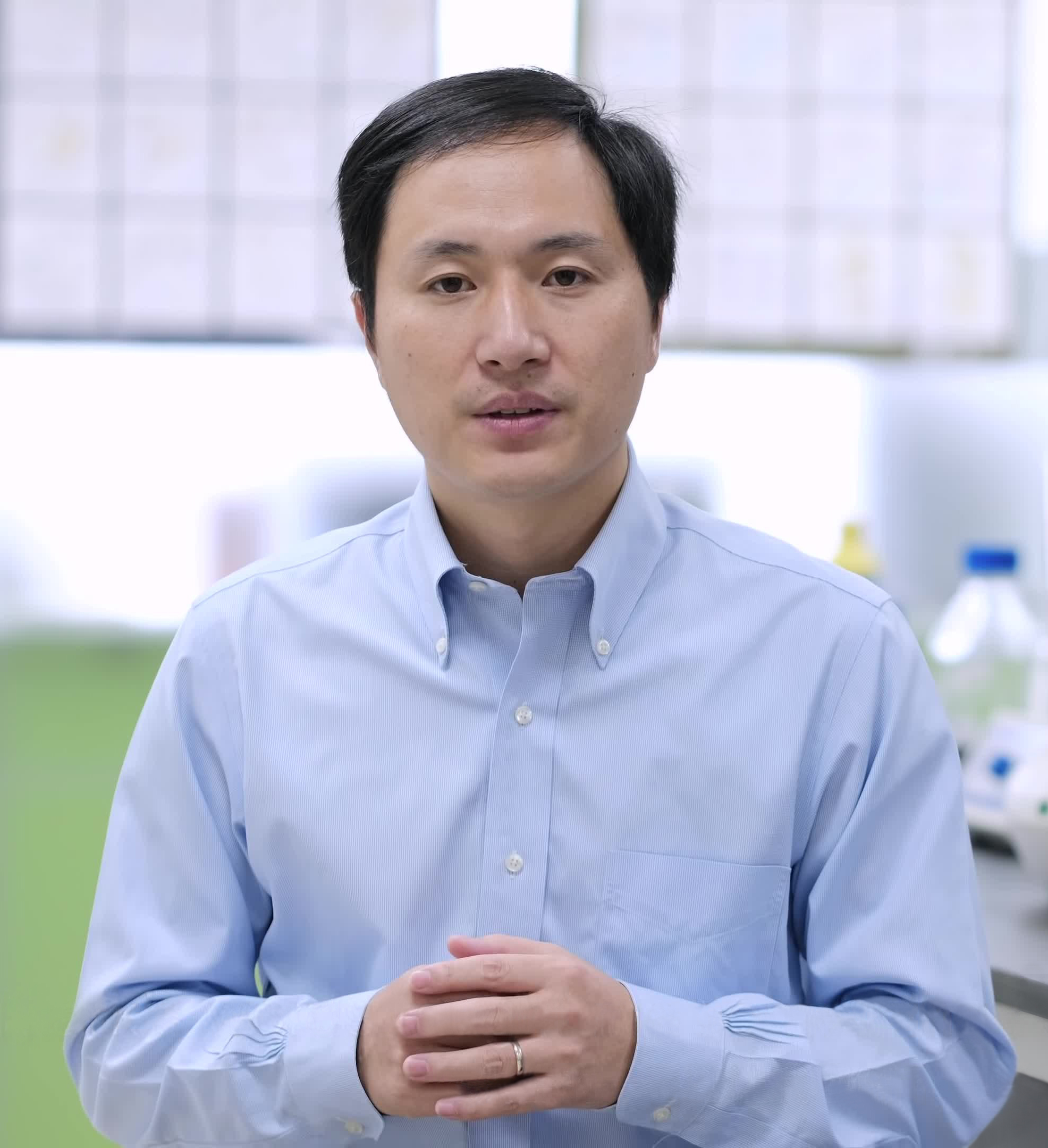
He Jiankui

The He Jiankui affair is a scientific and bioethical controversy concerning the use of genome editing following its first use on humans by Chinese scientist He Jiankui, who edited the genomes of human embryos in 2018. He became widely known on 26 November 2018 after he announced that he had created the first human genetically edited babies. He was listed in Time magazine's 100 most influential people of 2019. The affair led to ethical and legal controversies, resulting in the indictment of He and two of his collaborators, Zhang Renli and Qin Jinzhou. He eventually received widespread international condemnation.

He Jiankui, working at the Southern University of Science and Technology (SUSTech) in Shenzhen, China, started a project to help people with HIV-related fertility problems, specifically involving HIV-positive fathers and HIV-negative mothers. The subjects were offered standard in vitro fertilisation services and in addition, use of CRISPR gene editing (CRISPR/Cas9), a technology for modifying DNA. The embryos' genomes were edited to inactivate the CCR5 gene in an attempt to confer genetic resistance to HIV. The clinical project was conducted secretly until 25 November 2018, when MIT Technology Review broke the story of the human experiment based on information from the Chinese clinical trials registry. Compelled by the situation, he immediately announced the birth of genome-edited babies in a series of five YouTube videos the same day. The first babies, known by their pseudonyms Lulu (露露) and Nana (娜娜), are twin girls born in October 2018, and the second birth and third baby born was in 2019, named Amy. He reported that the babies were born healthy.

His actions received widespread criticism, and included concern for the girls' well-being. After his presentation on the research at the Second International Summit on Human Genome Editing at the University of Hong Kong on 28 November 2018, Chinese authorities suspended his research activities the following day. On 30 December 2019, a Chinese district court found He Jiankui guilty of illegal practice of medicine (equivalent to the crime of "practicing medicine without a license" in many other jurisdictions), (Note: He Jiankui's gene editing was deemed medical practice by the court. He had never obtained a medical degree or held a medical license in any jurisdiction. The court also found that he deliberately concealed crucial information and failed to disclose any details or risks associated with the program to the parents of the gene-edited babies. He recruited other people to impersonate the parents to undergo physical examinations. He also evaded government and university regulations through forgery and other means, and committed several other illegal acts.; In its judgment, the court stated that He Jiankui, in pursuit of fame and profit, crossed the bottom line of scientific research and medical ethics by rashly applying gene-editing technology to human assisted reproductive medicine, violating national regulations concerning practicing medicine and research, disrupting medical management order, and the circumstances were serious.) sentencing him to three years in prison with a fine of 3 million yuan. Zhang and Qin received an 18-month prison sentence and a 500,000-yuan fine, and were banned from working in assisted reproductive technology for life.

He Jiankui has been panned as a mad scientist. The impact of human gene editing on resistance to HIV infection and other body functions in experimental infants remains controversial. The World Health Organization has issued three reports on the guidelines of human genome editing since 2019, and the Chinese government has prepared regulations since May 2019. In 2020, the National People's Congress of China passed Civil Code and an amendment to Criminal Law that prohibit human gene editing and cloning with no exceptions; according to the Criminal Law, violators will be held criminally liable, with a maximum sentence of seven years in prison in serious cases.

== Origin ==
Since 2016, He Jiankui, then associate professor at the Southern University of Science and Technology (SUSTech) in Shenzhen, with Zhang Renli and Qin Jinzhou, have used human embryo in gene-editing technology for assisted reproductive medicine. On 10 June 2017, a Chinese couple, an HIV-positive father and HIV-negative mother, pseudonymously called Mark and Grace, attended a conference held by He at SUSTech. They were offered in vitro fertilisation (IVF) along with gene-editing of their embryos so as to develop innate resistance to HIV infection in their offspring. They agreed to volunteer through informed consent and the experiment was carried out in secrecy. Six other couples having similar fertility problems were subsequently recruited. The couples were recruited through a Beijing-based AIDS advocacy group called Baihualin China League. When later examined, the consent forms were noted as incomplete and inadequate. The couple were reported to have agreed to this experiment because, by Chinese rules, normally HIV positive fathers were not allowed to have children using IVF.

When the place of the clinical experiment was investigated, SUSTech declared that the university was not involved and that He had been on unpaid leave since February 2018, and his department attested that they were unaware of the research project.

== Experiment and birth ==
He Jiankui took sperm and eggs from the couples, performed in vitro fertilisation with the eggs and sperm, and then edited the genomes of the embryos using CRISPR/Cas9. The editing targeted a gene, CCR5, that codes for a protein that HIV uses to enter cells. He was trying to reproduce the phenotype of a specific mutation in the gene, CCR5-Δ32, that few people naturally have and that possibly confers innate resistance to HIV, as seen in the case of the Berlin Patient. However, rather than introducing the known CCR5-Δ32 mutation, he introduced a frameshift mutation intended to make the CCR5 protein entirely nonfunctional. According to He, Lulu and Nana carried both functional and mutant copies of CCR5 given mosaicism inherent in the present state of the art in germ-line editing. There are forms of HIV that use a different receptor instead of CCR5; therefore, the work of He did not theoretically protect Lulu and Nana from those forms of HIV. He used a preimplantation genetic diagnosis process on the embryos that were edited, where three to five single cells were removed, and fully sequenced them to identify chimerism and off-target errors. He says that during the pregnancy, cell-free fetal DNA was fully sequenced to check for off-target errors, and an amniocentesis was offered to check for problems with the pregnancy, but the mother declined. Lulu and Nana were born in secrecy in October 2018. They were reported by He to be normal and healthy.

=== Revelation ===
He Jiankui's announcement

He Jiankui was planning to reveal his experiments and the birth of Lulu and Nana at the Second International Summit on Human Genome Editing, which was to be organized at the University of Hong Kong during 27–29 November 2018. However, on 25 November 2018, Antonio Regalado, senior editor for biomedicine of MIT Technology Review, posted on the journal's website about the experiment based on He Jiankui's applications for conducting clinical trial that had been posted earlier on the Chinese clinical trials registry. At the time, He refused to comment on the conditions of the pregnancy. Prompted by the publicity, He immediately posted about his experiment and the successful birth of the twins on YouTube in five videos the same day. The next day, the Associated Press made the first formal news, which was most likely a pre-written account before the publicity. His experiment had received no independent confirmation, and had not been peer reviewed or published in a scientific journal. Soon after He's revelation, the Southern University of Science and Technology stated that He's research was conducted outside of their campus. China's National Health Commission also ordered provincial health officials to investigate his case soon after the experiment was revealed.

Amidst the furor, He was allowed to present his research at the Hong Kong meeting on 28 November under the title "CCR5 gene editing in mouse, monkey, and human embryos using CRISPR–Cas9". During the discussion session, He asserted, "Do you see your friends or relatives who may have a disease? They need help," and continued, "For millions of families with inherited disease or infectious disease, if we have this technology we can help them." In his speech, He also mentioned a second pregnancy under the same experiment. No reports were disclosed, but the birth was around August 2019, and it was affirmed on 30 December when the Chinese court returned a verdict mentioning that there were "three genetically-edited babies". The baby was later revealed in 2022 as Amy.

== Reactions and aftermath ==
On the news of Lulu and Nana having been born, the People's Daily announced the experimental result as "a historical breakthrough in the application of gene editing technology for disease prevention." But scientists at the Second International Summit on Human Genome Editing immediately developed serious concerns. Robin Lovell-Badge, head of the Laboratory of Stem Cell Biology and Developmental Genetics at the Francis Crick Institute, who moderated the session on 28 November, recalled that He Jiankui did not mention human embryos in the draft summary of the presentation. He received an urgent message on 25 November through Jennifer Doudna of the University of California, Berkeley, a pioneer of the CRISPR/Cas9 technology, to whom he had confided the news earlier that morning. As the news already broke out before the day of the presentation, he had to be brought in from his hotel by the University of Hong Kong security. Nobel laureate David Baltimore, the chair of the organizing committee of the summit, was the first to react after He's speech, and declared his horror and dismay at his work.

He Jiankui did not disclose the parents' names (other than their pseudonyms Mark and Grace) and they did not make themselves available to be interviewed, so their reaction to this experiment and the ensuing controversy is unknown. There was widespread criticism in the media and scientific community over the conduct of the clinical project and its secrecy, and concerns raised for the long term well-being of Lulu and Nana. Bioethicist Henry T. Greely of Stanford Law School declared, "I unequivocally condemn the experiment," and later, "He Jiankui's experiment was, amazingly, even worse than I first thought." Kiran Musunuru, one of the experts called on to review He's manuscript and who later wrote a book on the scandal, called it a "historic ethical fiasco, a deeply flawed experiment".

On the night of 26 November, 122 Chinese scientists issued a statement criticizing his research. They declared that the experiment was unethical, "crazy" and "a huge blow to the global reputation and development of Chinese science". The Chinese Academy of Medical Sciences made a condemnation statement on 5 January 2019 saying that:

We are opposed to any clinical operation of human embryo genome editing for reproductive purposes in violation of laws, regulations, and ethical norms in the absence of full scientific evaluation. In the rapidly developing area of genome editing technology, our scientific community should uphold the highest standards of bioethics in undertaking responsible biomedical research and applications and uphold our scientific reputation, the basic dignity of human life, and the collective integrity of our scientific community. The Chinese Government prohibits the genetic manipulation of human gametes, zygotes, and embryos for reproductive purposes ... Jiankui He's operations violated these regulations.

A series of investigations was opened by He's university, local authorities, and the Chinese government. On 26 November 2018, SUSTech released a public notification on its website condemning He's conduct, mentioning the key points as:

- The research work was conducted off-campus by Associate Professor He Jiankui without reporting to the university and the Department of Biology, and the university and the Department of Biology were unaware of it.
- The Academic Committee of the Department of Biology considers that Associate Professor He Jiankui's use of gene editing technology for human embryo research is a serious violation of academic ethics and academic standards.
- SUSTech strictly requires scientific research to comply with national laws and regulations and to respect and abide by international academic ethics and academic norms. The university will immediately hire authoritative experts to set up an independent committee to conduct an in-depth investigation, and will publish relevant information after the investigation.

On 28 November 2018, the organising committee of the Second International Summit on Human Genome Editing, led by Baltimore, issued a statement, declaring:

At this summit we heard an unexpected and deeply disturbing claim that human embryos had been edited and implanted, resulting in a pregnancy and the birth of twins. We recommend an independent assessment to verify this claim and to ascertain whether the claimed DNA modifications have occurred. Even if the modifications are verified, the procedure was irresponsible and failed to conform with international norms. Its flaws include an inadequate medical indication, a poorly designed study protocol, a failure to meet ethical standards for protecting the welfare of research subjects, and a lack of transparency in the development, review, and conduct of the clinical procedures.

On 29 January 2019, it was learned that a U.S. Nobel laureate Craig Mello interviewed He about his experiment with gene-edited babies. In February 2019, He's claims were reported to have been confirmed by Chinese investigators, according to NPR News. Around that time, news reported that the Chinese government may have helped fund the CRISPR babies experiment, at least in part, based on newly uncovered documents.

=== Consequences ===
On 29 November 2018, Chinese authorities suspended all of He's research activities, saying his work was "extremely abominable in nature" and a violation of Chinese law. He was sequestered in a university apartment under some sort of surveillance. On 21 January 2019, He was fired from his job at SUSTech and his teaching and research work at the university was terminated. The same day, the Guangdong Province administration investigated the "gene editing baby incident", which is explicitly prohibited by the state.

On 30 December 2019, the Shenzhen City Nanshan District People's Court found He Jiankui guilty of illegal practice of medicine (equivalent to the crime of "practicing medicine without a license" in many other jurisdictions), sentencing him to three years in prison with a fine of CN¥3 million (about US$434,000). According to the district court's judgment, He Jiankui's gene editing was deemed medical practice by the court. He had never obtained a medical degree or held a medical license in any jurisdiction. The court also found that he deliberately concealed crucial information and failed to disclose any details or risks associated with the program to the parents of the gene-edited babies. He recruited other people to impersonate the parents to undergo physical examinations. He also evaded government and university regulations through forgery and other means, and committed several other illegal acts. In its judgment, the court stated that He Jiankui, in pursuit of fame and profit, crossed the bottom line of scientific research and medical ethics by rashly applying gene-editing technology to human assisted reproductive medicine, violating national regulations concerning practicing medicine and research, disrupting medical management order, and the circumstances were serious.

Among the collaborators, only two were indicted – Zhang Renli of the Guangdong Academy of Medical Sciences and Guangdong General Hospital, received a two-year prison sentence and a 1-million RMB (about US$145,000) fine, and Qin Jinzhou of the Southern University of Science and Technology received an 18-month prison sentence and a 500,000 RMB (about US$72,000) fine. The three were found guilty of having "forged ethical review documents and misled doctors into unknowingly implanting gene-edited embryos into two women." Zhang and Qin were officially banned from working in assisted reproductive technology for life. In April 2022, He was released from prison.

On 26 November 2018, The CRISPR Journal published ahead of print an article by He, Ryan Ferrell, Chen Yuanlin, Qin Jinzhou, and Chen Yangran in which the authors justified the ethical use of CRISPR gene editing in humans. As the news of CRISPR babies broke out, the editors reexamined the paper and retracted it on 28 December, announcing:

[It] has since been widely reported that Dr. He conducted clinical studies involving germline editing of human embryos, resulting in several pregnancies and two alleged live births. This was most likely in violation of accepted bioethical international norms and local regulations. This work was directly relevant to the opinions laid out in the Perspective; the authors' failure to disclose this clinical work manifestly impacted editorial consideration of the manuscript.

Michael W. Deem, an American bioengineering professor at Rice University and He's doctoral advisor, was involved in the research and present when people involved in the study gave consent. Deem was the only non-Chinese author out of the 10 listed in the manuscript submitted to Nature. Deem came under investigation by Rice University after news of the work was made public. As of 2022, the university has not yet issued any information on his conduct. He resigned from the university in 2020, and pursued a business by creating a bioengineering and energy consultant company called Certus LLC.

Stanford University also investigated its faculty of He's confidants including William Hurlbut, Matthew Porteus, and Stephen Quake, his main mentor in gene editing. The university's review committee concluded that the accused "were not participants in [He Jiankui's] research regarding genome editing of human embryos for intended implantation and birth and that they had no research, financial or organizational ties to this research."

In response to He's work, the World Health Organization, formed a committee comprising "a global, multi-disciplinary expert panel" called the Expert Advisory Committee on Developing Global Standards for Governance and Oversight of Human Genome Editing "to examine the scientific, ethical, social and legal challenges associated with human genome editing (both somatic and germline)" in December 2018. In 2019, it issued a call to halt all work on human genome editing, and launched a global registry to track research in the field. It had issued three reports for the recommended guidelines on human genome editing since 2019. As of 2021, the committee stood by the grounds that while somatic gene therapies have become useful in several disease, germline and heritable human genome editing is still with risks, and should be banned.

In May 2019, the Chinese government prepared gene-editing regulations stressing that anyone found manipulating the human genome by genome-editing techniques would be held responsible for any related adverse consequences. The Civil Code of the People's Republic of China was amended in 2020, adding Article 1009, which states: "any medical research activity associated with human gene and human embryo must comply with the relevant laws, administrative regulations and national regulation, must not harm individuals and violate ethical morality and public interest." It was enacted on 1 January 2021. A draft of the 11th Amendment to the Criminal Law of the People's Republic of China in 2020 has incorporated three types of crime: the illegal practice of human gene editing, human embryo cloning and severe endangering of the security of human genetic resources; with penalties of imprisonment of up to 7 years and a fine.

As of December 2021, Vivien Marx reported in the Nature Biotechnology article that both children were healthy.

== Ethical controversies ==
=== Ethics of genome manipulation ===
Genome manipulations can be done at two levels: somatic (grown-up cells of the general body) and germline (sex cells and embryos for reproduction). The development of CRISPR gene editing enabled both somatic and germline editing (such as in assisted reproductive technology). There is no prohibition on somatic gene editing since the practice is generally covered by the available regulations. Prior to He's affair, there was already concern that it was possible to make genetically modified babies and such experiments would have ethical issues as the safety and success were not yet warranted by any study, and genetic enhancement of individual would be possible. Pioneer gene-editing scientists had warned in 2015 that "genome editing in human embryos using current technologies could have unpredictable effects on future generations. This makes it dangerous and ethically unacceptable. Such research could be exploited for non-therapeutic modifications." As Janet Rossant of the University of Toronto noted in 2018: "It has also raised ethical concerns, particularly with regard to the possibility of generating heritable changes in the human genome – so-called germline gene editing." In 2017, the National Academies of Sciences, Engineering, and Medicine published a report "Human Genome Editing: Science, Ethics and Governance" that endorsed germline gene editing in "the absence of reasonable alternatives" of disease management and to "improve IVF procedures and embryo implantation rates and reduce rates of miscarriage." However, the Declaration of Helsinki had stated that early embryo genome-editing for fertility purposes is unethical.

The American Society of Human Genetics had declared in 2017 that the basic research on in vitro human genome editing on embryos and gametes should be promoted but that "At this time, given the nature and number of unanswered scientific, ethical, and policy questions, it is inappropriate to perform germline gene editing that culminates in human pregnancy." In July 2018, the Nuffield Council on Bioethics published a policy document titled Genome Editing and Human Reproduction: Social and Ethical Issues in which it advocated human germline editing saying that it "is not 'morally unacceptable in itself' and could be ethically permissible in certain circumstances" when there are sufficient safety measures. The moral justification created critical debates. The United States National Institutes of Health Somatic Cell Genome Editing Consortium held that it "strictly focused on somatic editing; germline editing is not only excluded as a goal but is also considered to be an unacceptable outcome that should be carefully prevented."

The Chinese law Measures on Administration of Assisted Human Reproduction Technology (2001) prohibits any genetic manipulation of human embryos for reproductive purposes and allows assisted reproductive technology to be performed only by authorized personnel. On 7 March 2017, He Jiankui applied for ethics approval from Shenzhen HarMoniCare Women and Children's Hospital. In the application, He claimed that the genetically edited babies would be immune to HIV infection, in addition to smallpox and cholera, commenting: "This is going to be a great science and medicine achievement ever since the IVF technology which was awarded the Nobel Prize in 2010, and will also bring hope to numerous genetic disease patients." It was approved and signed by Lin Zhitong, the hospital administrator and one-time Director of Direct Genomics, a company established by He. Upon an inquiry, the hospital denied such approval. The hospital's spokesperson declared that there were no records of such ethical approval, saying, "[The] gene editing process did not take place at our hospital. The babies were not born here either." It was later confirmed that the approval certificate was forged.

Sheldon Krimsky of Tufts University reported that "[He Jiankui] is not a medical doctor, but rather received his doctorate in biophysics and did postdoctoral studies in gene sequencing; he lacks training in bioethics." However, He was aware of the ethical issues. On 5 November 2018, He and his collaborators submitted a manuscript on ethical guidelines for reproductive genome editing titled "Draft Ethical Principles for Therapeutic Assisted Reproductive Technologies" to The CRISPR Journal. It was published on 26 November, soon after news of the human experiment broke out. The journal made an inquiry concerning conflicts of interests, which was not disclosed by He. With no justification from He, the journal retracted the paper with a comment that it "was most likely in violation of accepted bioethical international norms and local regulations."

Although there were no specific laws in China on gene editing in humans, He Jiankui violated the available guideline on handling human embryos. According to the Guidelines for Ethical Principles in Human Embryonic Stem Cell Research (2003) of the Ministry of Science and Technology and the National Health Commission of China:

Research in human embryonic stem cells shall be in compliance with the following behavioral norms:

1. Where blastula is obtained from external fertilization, somatic nucleus transplantation, unisexual duplicating technique or genetic modification, the culture period in vitro shall not exceed 14 days from the day of fecundation or nuclear transplantation.

He Jiankui also attended an important meeting on "The ethics and societal aspects of gene editing" in January 2017 organized by Jennifer Doudna and William Hurlbut of Stanford University. Upon invitation from Doudna, He presented a topic on "Safety of Human Gene Embryo Editing" and later recalled that "There were very many thorny questions, triggering heated debates, and the smell of gunpowder was in the air."

The consent form of the experiment titled "Informed Consent" also indicates dubious statements. The aim of the study was presented as "an AIDS vaccine development project", even though the study was not about vaccines. Present was technical jargon which would be incomprehensible to a layperson. One of the more peculiar statement is that if the participants decide to abort the experiment "in the first cycle of IVF until 28 days post-birth of the baby", they would have to "pay back all the costs that the project team has paid for you. If the payment is not received within 10 calendar days from the issuance of the notification of violation by the project team, another 100,000 RMB (about US$14,000) of fine will be charged." This violates the voluntary nature of the participation.

=== Medical ethics ===
CRISPR gene editing technology in humans has the potential to cause profound social impacts, such as in the long-term prevention of diseases in humans. However, His human experiments raised ethical concerns the effect are unknown on future generations. Ethical concerns have been raised relative to the four ethical criteria of autonomy, justice, beneficence, and non-maleficence, first postulated by Tom Beauchamp and James Childress in Principles of Biomedical Ethics.

The ethical principle of autonomy requires that individuals have the ability and comprehensive information to make their own decisions based on their values and beliefs. He violated this by failing to inform patients of potential risks, including off-target mutations that might be a threat to the twins' lives.

Since He had forged the approval certificate from the hospital's Director of Direct Genomics, the procedure was likely "unlawful", which is against the principle of non-maleficence. Off-target mutations are likely to start at undesired sites, causing cell death or cell transformation. Sonia Ouagrham-Gormley, an associate professor in the Schar School of Policy and Government at George Mason University, and Kathleen Vogel, a professor in the School for the Future of Innovation in Society at Arizona State University, stated that the procedure was "unnecessary" and "risks the safety of the patients". The researchers criticized He's unethical action by presenting the fact that the prevention of HIV transmission from parents to newborn babies can be safely achieved with existing standard methods, such as sperm washing and caesarian section delivery.

The principle of justice argues that individuals should have the right to receive the same amount of care from medical providers regardless of their social and economic background. Beneficence requires healthcare providers to maximize benefits and put the benefit of the patients first. He's intervention in the twins' genes cannot be justified, and the risk-benefit is unacceptable. He paid the couple $40,000 to ensure that they would keep his operation confidential. This action can be viewed as an inducement and violates China's regulations on the prohibition of genetic manipulation of human gametes, zygotes, and embryos for reproductive purposes; HIV carriers being not allowed to have assisted reproductive technologies, and the manipulation of a human embryo for research being only permitted within 14 days.

Thus, while genome editing in humans has potential as an effective and cost-efficient method for manipulating genes within living cells, it requires more research and transparent procedures to be ethically justified.

== Scientific issues ==
=== Effects of mutations ===
It is an established fact that C-C chemokine receptor type 5 (CCR5) is a protein essential for HIV infection of the white blood cells by acting as co-receptor to HIV. Mutation in the gene CCR5 (called CCR5Δ32 because the mutation is specifically a deletion of 32 base pairs in human chromosome 3) renders resistance to HIV. Resistance is higher when mutations are in two copies (homozygous alleles) and in only one copy (heterozygous alleles) the protection is very weak and slow. Not all homozygote individuals are completely resistant. In natural population, CCR5Δ32 homozygotes are rarer than heterozygotes. In 2007, Timothy Ray Brown (dubbed the Berlin patient) became the first person to be completely cured of HIV infection following a stem cell transplant from a CCR5Δ32 homozygous donor.

He Jiankui overlooked these facts. Two days after Lulu and Nana were born, their DNA were collected from blood samples of their umbilical cord and placenta. Whole genome sequencing confirmed the mutations. However, available sources indicate that Lulu and Nana are carrying incomplete CCR5 mutations. Lulu carries a mutant CCR5 that has a 15-bp in-frame deletion only in one chromosome 3 (heterozygous allele) while the other chromosome 3 is normal; and Nana carries a homozygous mutant gene with a 4-bp deletion and a single base insertion. He therefore failed to achieve the complete 32-bp deletion. Moreover, Lulu has only heterozygous modification which is not known to prevent HIV infection. Because the babies' mutations are different from the typical CCR5Δ32 mutation it is not clear whether or not they are prone to infection. There are also concerns about an adverse effect called off-target mutation in CRISPR/Cas9 editing and mosaicism, a condition in which many different genetic lines develop in the same embryo. Off-target mutation may cause health hazards, while mosaicism may create HIV susceptible cells. Fyodor Urnov, Director at the Altius Institute for Biomedical Sciences at Washington, asserted that "This [off-target mutation] is a key problem for the entirety of the embryo-editing field, one that the authors sweep under the rug here," and continued, "They [He's team] should have worked and worked and worked until they reduced mosaicism to as close to zero as possible. This failed completely. They forged ahead anyway."

His data on Lulu and Nana's mutation alignment (in Sanger chromatogram) showed three modifications, while two should be expected. Particularly in Lulu, the mutation is much more complex than He's report. There were three different combinations of alleles: two normal copies of CCR5, one normal copy and one with a 15-bp deletion, and one normal copy and an unknown large insertion. But George Church of Harvard University, in an interview with Science, explained that off-target mutations may not be dangerous, and that there is no need to reduce mosaicism excessively, saying, "There's no evidence of off-target causing problems in animals or cells. We have pigs that have dozens of CRISPR mutations and a mouse strain that has 40 CRISPR sites going off constantly and there are off-target effects in these animals, but we have no evidence of negative consequences." As to mosaicism, he said, "It may never be zero. We don't wait for radiation to be zero before we do positron emission tomography scans or x-rays."

In February 2019, scientists reported that Lulu and Nana may have inadvertently (or perhaps, intentionally) had their brains altered, since CCR5 deletion is linked to improved memory function in mice, as well as enhanced recovery from strokes in humans. Although He Jiankui stated during the Second International Summit on Human Genome Editing, that he was against using genome editing for enhancement, he also acknowledged that he was aware of the studies linking CCR5 to enhanced memory function.

In June 2019, researchers incorrectly suggested that the purportedly genetically edited humans may have been mutated in a way that shortens life expectancy. Rasmus Nielsen and Wei Xinzhu, both at the University of California, Berkeley, reported in Nature Medicine of their analysis of the longevity of 409,693 individuals from British death registry (UK BioBank) with the conclusion that two copies of CCR5Δ32 mutations (homozygotes) were about 20% more likely than the rest of the population to die before they were 76 years of age. The research finding was widely publicized in the popular and scientific media. However, the article overlooked sampling bias in UK Biobank's data, resulting in an erroneous interpretation, and was retracted four months later.

=== Rejections from peer-reviewed journals ===
Scientific works are normally published in peer-reviewed journals, but He failed to do so regarding the birth of gene-edited babies. This was one of the grounds on which He was criticized. It was later reported that He did submit two manuscripts to Nature and the Journal of the American Medical Association, which were both rejected, mainly on ethical issues. He's first manuscript titled "Birth of Twins After Genome Editing for HIV Resistance" was submitted to Nature on 19 November. He shared copies of the manuscript to the Associated Press, which he further allowed to document his works. In an interview, Hurlbut opined that the condemnation of He's work would have been less harsh if the study had been published, and said, "If it had been published, the publishing process itself would have brought a level of credibility because of the normal scrutiny involved; the data analysis would have been vetted."

The scientific manuscripts of He were revealed when an anonymous source sent them to the MIT Technology Review, which reported them on 3 December 2019.

== Related research ==
The first successful gene-editing experiment of CCR5 in humans was in 2014. A team of researchers at the University of Pennsylvania, Philadelphia, Albert Einstein College of Medicine, New York, and Sangamo BioSciences, California, reported that they modified CCR5 on the blood cells (CD4 T cells) using zinc-finger nuclease which they introduced (infused) into 12 individuals with HIV. After complete treatment, the patients showed decreased viral load, and in one, HIV disappeared. The result was published in The New England Journal of Medicine.

Chinese scientists have successfully used CRISPR editing to create mutant mice and rats since 2013. The next year they reported successful experiment in monkeys involving a removal of two key genes (PPAR-γ and RAG1) that play roles in cell growth and cancer development. One of the leading researchers, Yuyu Niu later collaborated with He Jiankui in 2017 to test the CRISPR editing of CCR5 in monkeys, but the outcome was not fully assessed or published. Niu later commented that they "had no idea he was going to do this in a human being." In 2018, his team reported an induction of mutation to produce muscular dystrophy, and simultaneously by another independent Chinese team an induction of growth retardation in monkeys using CRISPR editing. In February 2018, scientists at the Chinese Academy of Sciences reported the creation of five identical cloned gene-edited monkeys, using the same cloning technique that was used by them to create the first cloned primates Zhong Zhong and Hua Hua in 2018 and Dolly the sheep. The mutant monkeys and clones were made for understanding several medical diseases and not for disease resistance.

The first clinical trials of CRISPR-Cas9 for the treatment of genetic blood disorders was started in August 2018. The study was jointly conducted by CRISPR Therapeutics, a Swiss-based company, and Vertex Pharmaceuticals, headquartered in Boston. The result was first announced on 19 November 2019 which states that the first two patients, one with β-thalassemia and the other with sickle cell disease, were treated successfully. Under the same project, a parallel study on 6 individuals with sickle cell disease was also conducted at Harvard Medical School, Boston. In both studies, the gene involved in blood cell formation BCL11A was modified in the bone marrow extracted from the individuals. Both the studies were simultaneously published in The New England Journal of Medicine on 21 January 2021 in two papers. The individuals have not complained about the symptoms and needed blood transfusion normally required in such disease, but the method is arduous and poses high risk of infection in the bone marrow, to which David Rees at King's College Hospital commented, "Scientifically, these studies are quite exciting. But it's hard to see this being a mainstream treatment in the long term."

In June 2019, Denis Rebrikov at the Kulakov National Medical Research Center for Obstetrics, Gynecology and Perinatology in Moscow announced through Nature that he was planning to repeat He's experiment once he got official approval from the Russian Ministry of Health and other authorities. Rebrikov asserted that he would use safer and better method than that of He, saying, "I think I'm crazy enough to do it." In a subsequent report on 17 October, Rebrikov said that he was approached by a deaf couple for help. He already started in vitro experiment to repair a gene that causes deafness, GJB2, using CRISPR.

In 2019, the Abramson Cancer Center of the University of Pennsylvania in US announced the use of the CRISPR technology to edit cancer genes in humans, and the results of the phase I clinical trial in 2020. The study started in 2018 with an official registration in the US clinical trials registry. The report in the journal Science indicates three individuals in their 60s with advanced refractory cancer, two of them with the blood cancer (multiple myeloma) and one with tissue cancer (sarcoma), were treated with their own cancer cells after CRISPR editing. The experiment was based on CAR T-cell therapy by which the T cells, obtained from the individuals were removed of three genes involved in cancer and were added a gene CTAG1B that produces an antigen NY-ESO-1. When the edited cells were introduced back into the individuals, the antigens attack the cancer cells. Although the results were acclaimed as the first "success of gene editing and cell function" in cancer research and "an important milestone in the development and clinical application of gene-edited effector cell therapy," it was far from curing the diseases. One died after the clinical trial, and the other two had recurrent cancer.

A similar clinical trial was reported by a team of Chinese scientists at the Sichuan University and their collaborators in 2020 in Nature Medicine. Here they removed only one gene (PDCD1 that produces the protein PD-1) in the T cells from 12 individuals having late-stage lung cancer. The study was found to be safe and effective. However, the edited T cells were not fully efficient and disappeared in most individuals, indicating that the treatments were not completely successful.

== See also ==
- Designer baby
- Human Nature (2019 CRISPR film documentary)
- Hwang affair
- Unnatural Selection (2019 TV documentary)
- Bioethics
