= Michael W. Deem =

American engineer, scientist, inventor, and entrepreneur

Michael William Deem
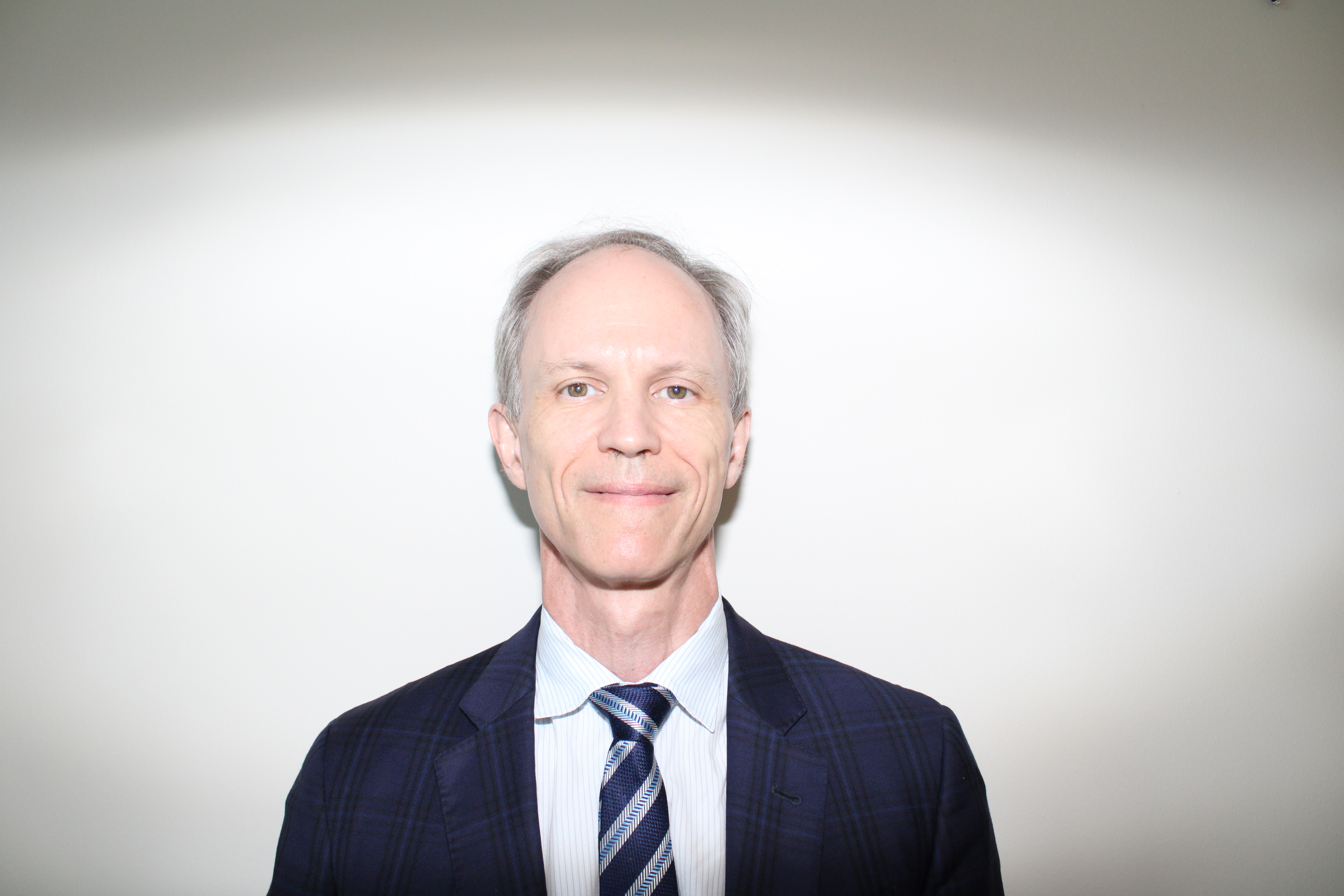
- Education: California Institute of Technology (BS); University of California, Berkeley (PhD)
- Known for: parallel tempering
- Awards: National Science Foundation CAREER Awards (1997); Top 100 Young Innovator, MIT Technology Review (1999); Alfred P. Sloan Fellow (2009)
- Scientific career
- Fields: Biochemical engineering Genetic engineering
- Thesis: Field-theoretic treatment of disordered systems (1994)
- Doctoral advisor: David Chandler
- Doctoral students: Jiankui He
- Website: mwdeem.org

Michael William Deem is an American engineer, scientist, inventor, and entrepreneur. He is known for his work in biochemical and genetic engineering, and for his contributions to parallel tempering methods in computational science.

== Education ==
Deem received a Bachelor of Science degree with a major in chemical engineering from the California Institute of Technology in 1991 and a Doctor of Philosophy degree in chemical engineering from the University of California, Berkeley in 1994. His doctoral thesis research was titled Field-theoretic treatment of disordered systems, under the supervision of David Chandler. He conducted postdoctoral research in physics at Harvard University from 1995 to 1996 with David R. Nelson.

== Career ==
Deem began his academic career at the University of California, Los Angeles in 1996, where he rose to the rank of associate professor of chemical engineering. From 2002 to 2020, he was the John W. Cox Professor of Biochemical and Genetic Engineering and professor of physics and astronomy at Rice University in Houston, Texas. He served as the founding director of Rice’s graduate program in systems, synthetic, and physical biology (2012–2014) and as chair of the bioengineering department (2014–2017).

He has been elected Fellow of the American Physical Society, the American Institute for Medical and Biological Engineering, the American Academy of Arts and Sciences, and the Biomedical Engineering Society. Deem has received several awards, including a National Science Foundation CAREER Award (1997), recognition as a Top 100 Young Innovator by the MIT Technology Review (1999), an Alfred P. Sloan Fellowship (2000), the Camille Dreyfus Teacher-Scholar Award (2002), the Allan P. Colburn Award of the American Institute of Chemical Engineers (2004), the Professional Progress Award of AIChE (2010), the Edith and Peter O'Donnell Award from the TAMEST, a visiting scholar appointment with Phi Beta Kappa (2012–2013), and the Donald W. Breck Award in Molecular Sieve Science from the International Zeolite Association (2019).

Deem, being a faculty member at Rice University, served as the doctoral advisor to He Jiankui, a PhD student of his from 2008 to 2010, who later became known for the 2018 He Jiankui affair surrounding the first genetically modified babies. The experiment caused "global outrage", and He Jiankui was imprisoned for his role. In November 2018, Rice University announced a full investigation into Deem's involvement in the CRISPR'd baby project. During the investigation, Rice discovered Deem had applied for funding from a "foreign talent program", but failed to disclose it to the university. The results of the investigation are unknown. According to Stat News, Deem received DNA data from the clinical trials, and participated in an informed consent meeting with potential participants. Both were denied by Deem's lawyers, though video shows Deem was in the room with the potential participants. Around January 2019, the Office for Human Research Protections also began investigating Deem. According to Benjamin Hurlbut, who received access to some records relating to the trial, Deem was "unambiguously" involved, but Hurlbut was unsure whether Deem violated federal ethics law. Deem resigned from Rice University in summer 2020.

From 2021 to 2022, Deem was an entrepreneur in residence at Khosla Ventures, where he helped select, mentor, and incubate portfolio companies. From 2023, Deem was a managing partner with Angeliki Fund.

== Selected publications ==
- Earl, David J.; Deem, Michael W. (2005). "Parallel tempering: Theory, applications, and new perspectives". Physical Chemistry Chemical Physics. 7 (23): 3910–3916. arXiv:physics/0508111. doi:10.1039/B509983H.
- Bogarad, Leonard D.; Deem, Michael W. (1999). "A hierarchical approach to protein molecular evolution". Proc. Natl. Acad. Sci. U.S.A. 96 (6): 2591–2595. arXiv:cond-mat/9903310. doi:10.1073/pnas.96.6.2591. PMID 10077558.
- Gupta, Vishal; Earl, David J.; Deem, Michael W. (2006). "Quantifying influenza vaccine efficacy and antigenic distance". Vaccine. 24 (18): 3881–3888. arXiv:q-bio/0503030. doi:10.1016/j.vaccine.2006.01.010. PMID 16504238.
- Lin, Li-Chiang; Berger, Adam H.; Martin, Richard L.; Kim, Jihan; Swisher, Joseph A.; Jariwala, Kuldeep; Rycroft, Chris H.; Bhown, Abhoyjit S.; Deem, Michael W.; Haranczyk, Maciej; Smit, Berend (2012). "In silico screening of carbon-capture materials". Nature Materials. 11: 633–641. doi:10.1038/nmat3336. PMID 22641192.
- Falcioni, Marco; Deem, Michael W. (1999). "A biased Monte Carlo scheme for zeolite structure solution". The Journal of Chemical Physics. 110 (3): 1754–1766. arXiv:cond-mat/9809085. doi:10.1063/1.477812.
- Earl, David J.; Deem, Michael W. (2004). "Evolvability is a selectable trait". Proc. Natl. Acad. Sci. U.S.A. 101 (32): 11531–11536. arXiv:q-bio/0407012. doi:10.1073/pnas.0404656101. PMID 15277680.
- Deem, Michael W. (2013). "Statistical mechanics of modularity and horizontal gene transfer". Annual Review of Condensed Matter Physics. 4: 287–311. doi:10.1146/annurev-conmatphys-030212-184223.

== See also ==
- Evidence of common descent
