= Make People Better =

- Directed by: Cody Sheehy
- Written by: Mark Monroe
- Based on: He Jiankui affair
- Produced by: Cody Sheehy; Samira Kiani; Mark Monroe
- Cinematography: Cody Sheehy
- Edited by: Greg O'Toole
- Music by: Tyler Strickland
- Production company: Rhumbline Media
- Distributed by: Gravitas Films
- Release date: 13 December 2022
- Running time: 83 minutes
- Country: United States
- Language: English

Make People Better is a 2022 documentary film about the use of genetic engineering (called CRISPR gene editing) to enhance two twins girls to be immune to HIV. Directed by Cody Sheehy of Rhumbline Media, it was originated by Samira Kiani, a biotechnologist then at Arizona State University. It focuses on the circumstances involving Chinese biologist He Jiankui who created the first genetically modified humans in 2018. Featured experts included Antonio Regalado, senior editor for biomedicine of MIT Technology Review, who first discovered and revealed the secret experiment, and Benjamin Hurlbut, a bioethicist at the Arizona State University.

The film was released on 13 December 2022 by Gravitas Films and Internationally by Cats & Docs. It premiered at the Hot Docs Canadian International Documentary Festival, and was simultaneously launched on the iTunes Store and Amazon Prime Video. The title was taken from James Watson's reply as He asked him, "Do you think that that's [genetically modifying babies is] a good thing to do?"

== Background ==
=== Code of the Wild: The Nature of Us ===
CRISPR (clustered regularly interspaced short palindromic repeats) gene editing is a scientific method by which DNA molecules are cut using an enzyme, CRISPR associated protein 9 (Cas9) so that specific genes can be removed or replaced. The technique, independently developed by Emmanuelle Charpentier and Jennifer Doudna, had been used to make genetically modified organisms and better genes in genetic diseases. Samira Kiani was a researcher on CRISPR gene editing at Arizona State University and teamed up with Cody Sheehy of the Rhumbline Media to make a documentary film on the revolutionary technique. They started a project called Code of the Wild: The Nature of Us in 2018.

They first approached expert in the field, George Church at Harvard University, who was popularly known as the "Founding Father of Genomics", and Antonio Regalado, senior editor for biomedicine of MIT Technology Review, who had been well-versed in the development of the technique. Regalado hinted them that CRISPR gene-edited babies would be born in China "very soon". They further learned from Kiani's former acquaintance Ryan Farrell who was working as a public relations specialist to He Jiankui, associate professor in the Department of Biology of the Southern University of Science and Technology(SUSTech) in Shenzhen, China, that He was running a human germline-editing experiment. They visited He for an interview but received no information on the forthcoming genetically modified babies.

=== He Jiankui affair ===
On 25 November 2018, Regalado posted on MIT Technology Review website that He Jiankui was making CRIPSR babies. As it was publicised, He was prompted to announce his experiment and posted the news of the birth of twins, nicknamed Lulu and Nana, on YouTube in five videos the same day. He formally presented the experiment at the Second International Summit on Human Genome Editing organized at the University of Hong Kong on 28 November 2018. He explained that the experiment was to make the babies resistant to HIV infection as they were (as embryos) obtained from an HIV-positive father. He specifically used a mutant gene named CCR5-Δ32 that is known to confer innate resistance to HIV. The twins were born in secrecy in October 2018, and a third baby (revealed in 2022 as Amy) was then almost born, as He reported.

Although the People's Daily announced the experimental result as "a historical breakthrough in the application of gene editing technology for disease prevention," the news was met with criticisms from scientists. The Chinese Academy of Medical Sciences publicly condemned the experiment as violation of medical regulations and ethical norms. A group of 122 Chinese scientists jointly issued a statement that the experiment was unethical, "crazy" and "a huge blow to the global reputation and development of Chinese science". He's university, local authorities, and the Chinese government made a series of investigations, and He was found guilty of violating academic ethics and national laws on the use of human embryos. On 21 January 2019, He was fired by SUSTech and all connections were terminated. On 30 December 2019, the Shenzhen Nanshan District People's Court sentenced He to three years in prison and with a fine of 3 million RMB (US$430,000).

== Participants ==
The film was based on the involvement of the following people:

- He Jiankui, who made the first CRISPR-edited babies
- Antonio Regalado, editor of MIT Technology Review who first revealed He's experiment
- Ryan Farrell, a public relations specialist to He
- Benjamin Hurlbut, a bioethicist at the Arizona State University

== Reception and review ==
Courtney Small on Point of View Magazine gives a positive review, remarking: "A necessary conversation starter, Make People Better is an intriguing examination of a scientist who was hung out to dry by a community who helped elevate him in the first place." Liz Whittemore on Reel News Daily agrees, commenting that it "does an excellent job of putting scientific advances into perspective." Chris Jones on The Atlanta Mail commented it as "an excellent film for anyone interested in" the understanding of scientific development.

However, the film received mostly critical reviews. Beandrea July on The New York Times criticised the film, saying that "a glut of animations and B-roll footage makes the film's visuals feel convoluted, and a flat narrative structure further muddies the waters." She also wrote that the way Sheehy presented the story was clumsy and "deflating the films dramatic tension with so little fanfare that the information's premature landing barely registers." She also criticised the film for omitting the news that He was released (in April 2022) while the film was being made. Christopher Cross on Tilt said that the documentary is a narrow-sighted view as the case is not just for scientists, and argues that Sheehy "ignores some of the most glaring facets of a hugely impactful breakthrough. As a thriller, Make People Better is solid, but as a documentary, it's better enjoyed as a Wikipedia article."

G. Owen Schaefer, a biomedical ethicist at the National University of Singapore said, "The documentary does not reflect critically on its own title. The origin of the phrase "make people better" is surprising and the film's most clever narrative moment, so I won't spoil it. But does heritable gene editing really make people better? Perhaps instead, it makes better people."
