= Unnatural Selection (TV series) =

2019 TV documentary series

- Original poster
- Genre: Documentary
- Created by: Leeor Kaufman; Joe Egender
- Directed by: Leeor Kaufman; Joe Egender
- Theme music composer: Gene Back; T. Griffin
- Original language: English
- No. of seasons: 1
- No. of episodes: 4

Production
- Executive producers: Joe Egender; Brandon Hill; Leeor Kaufman; Christian Thompson; Christina Clusiau; Shaul Schwarz
- Producers: Lauren Haber; Marc Zahakos
- Cinematography: Leeor Kaufman; Anna Beeke; Christina Clusiau; Shaul Schwarz; Ling Mai; Joshua Ryan Perez; Jack Schurman; Grant Slater; Andrey Alistratov; Jason Blevins; Mae Ryan; Moussa Traoré
- Editors: Mohamed Elsafty; Connor Kalista; James Morrison; Bill Sebastian
- Running time: 62–70 minutes
- Production companies: Radley Studios; Reel Peak Films; Twist and Turn Films

Original release
- Network: Netflix
- Release: October 18, 2019

Unnatural Selection (or stylized as, "~~un~~natural selection") is a 2019 American documentary television series. It presents an overview of genetic engineering, particularly the DNA-editing technology of CRISPR, from the perspective of scientists, corporations and biohackers working from their home. The series was released on Netflix on October 18, 2019.

== Episodes ==
=== Season 1 ===
The first season consists of 4 episodes. It became available for streaming on October 18, 2019.

| No. | Title | | Directed by | Written by | Original release date |
|---|---|---|---|---|---|
| 1 | "Cut, Paste, Life" | 70 mins | Leeor Kaufman; Joe Egender | Leeor Kaufman; Joe Egender | October 18, 2019 |
The technique of editing genes may help eliminate some diseases – biohackers experiment with the technique – scientists study related ethical considerations.
| 2 | "The First to Try" | 64 mins | Leeor Kaufman; Joe Egender | Leeor Kaufman; Joe Egender | October 18, 2019 |
Trying new gene therapies may (or may not) help the lives of patients – there are considerable risks involved; improvements are not at all assured.
| 3 | "Changing an Entire Species" | 62 mins | Leeor Kaufman; Joe Egender | Leeor Kaufman; Joe Egender | October 18, 2019 |
The consequences of editing genes may be considerable and far-reaching — species may be modified in unforeseen ways or, perhaps, eliminated entirely – ethicists and others are deeply concerned.
| 4 | "Our Next Generation" | 68 mins | Leeor Kaufman; Joe Egender | Leeor Kaufman; Joe Egender | October 18, 2019 |
A couple waits for their "three-person baby" in the Nadiya Clinic in Kyiv that employs pronuclear transfer techniques.

== Participants ==
The documentary TV series includes the following notable participants (alphabetized by last name):

- Andrea Crisanti – Italian microbiologist
- Nelson Dellis – American memory athlete
- Jennifer Doudna – American biochemist and Nobel laureate for CRISPR
- Victor Dzau – President, U.S. National Academy of Medicine
- Preston Estep – American geneticist and CSO of Veritas Genetics
- Kevin M. Esvelt – American biologist
- Katherine A. High – American doctor and CSO of Spark Therapeutics
- Juan Carlos Izpisúa Belmonte – Spanish geneticist
- Jeffrey Kahn – American professor of bioethics
- James Russell – New Zealand ecologist
- Aaron Traywick – American life extension activist
- Josiah Zayner – American biohacker, artist, and scientist
- John J. Zhang – Fertility Specialist

== Reception ==
According to reviewer Megan Molteni, writing for Wired Magazine, "Unnatural Selection chronicles the ambitions and struggles of scientists, doctors, patients, conservationists, and biohackers as they seek to wrest control of evolution from nature itself. They are all navigating the profound ethical dilemmas of a world where it’s possible to rewrite the code of life inside any organism, including human ... If you were looking for a Schoolhouse Rock! explanation of how Crispr works or a deep dive on the history of its discovery, Unnatural Selection won’t deliver ... All the requisite references will be made [in the series]—to Gattaca, to Huxley, to “life, uh, finds a way.” ... After watching Unnatural Selection you might not have a better understanding of how Crispr-Cas9 differs from Crispr-Cas12e, a, or b, but you’ll definitely have something to talk about on the subway."

According to reviewer Dream McClinton, writing for The Guardian, "For the [film-makers], the series had to tell the broader, more intricate story of genetic engineering, a story filled with great risk, benefits, consequences, emotions, sentiments and future, to better illuminate the field and further the discussion on the technology ... The series is haunted by feelings of ambivalence from the scientists who are cautious about tipping the scales towards a possible dystopian future .. Unnatural Selection demonstrates the worry of many, and the hope of others, threaded into a huge tapestry of possibility of a more perfect future ... While [one of the film-makers] doubts the series will change the minds of the public about genetic engineering, [he] hopes it will educate some about both the benefits and risks of genetic engineering."

There are other reviews of the series, including reviews from the TheReviewGeek and ReadySteadyCut.

== See also ==
- Brave New World, 1932 Aldous Huxley novel
- Brief Answers to the Big Questions,
  2018 Stephen Hawking book
- Designer baby
- Human Nature (2019 CRISPR film documentary)
- Make People Better (2022 documentary)
- Lulu and Nana controversy
- Netflix TV documentary programs
- Prime editing
