= Jo Zayner =

American biohacker, artist, and scientist (born 1981)

Josie Zayner
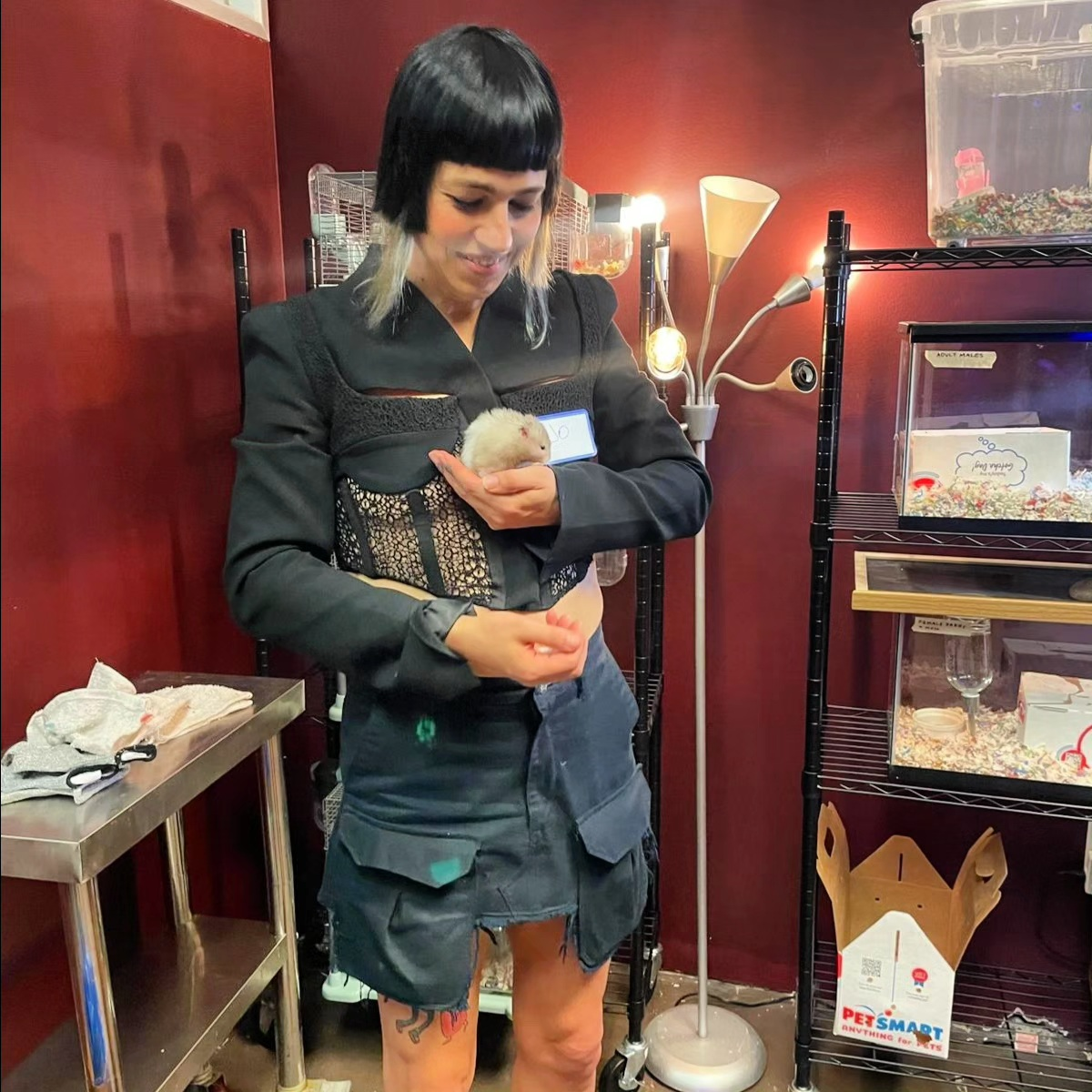
- Josie Zayner holding a hamster
- Born: February 8, 1981 (age 45)
- Occupations: Bio-engineer, biohacker, and CEO of The ODIN
- Known for: Self-experimentation with genetic material

Josie Zayner (formerly Josiah Zayner; alternatively Jo; born February 8, 1981) is a biohacker, artist, and scientist best known for her self-experimentation and work making hands-on genetic engineering accessible to a lay audience, including CRISPR.

== Education ==
At the age of 19, Zayner worked at Motorola as a programmer. She has a BA in plant biology from Southern Illinois University and a Ph.D in biophysics (2013) from the University of Chicago. Before receiving her Ph.D, Zayner earned a MSc in cell and molecular biology from Appalachian State University.

== Career ==
Zayner spent two years as a researcher at the Mountain View, California's NASA Ames Space Synthetic Biology Research Center, where she worked on Martian colony habitat design. While at the agency, Zayner also analyzed speech patterns in online chat, Twitter, and books, and found that language on Twitter and online chat is closer to how people talk than to how they write. Zayner found NASA's scientific work less innovative than she expected, and upon leaving in January 2016, she launched a crowdfunding campaign to provide CRISPR kits to let the general public experiment with editing bacterial DNA. Zayner also continued her grad school business, The ODIN, which sells kits to let the general public experiment at home. The company's main adviser is George Church, professor of genetics at Harvard Medical School and director of PersonalGenomes.org. In May 2016, The ODIN had four employees and operated out of Zayner's garage.

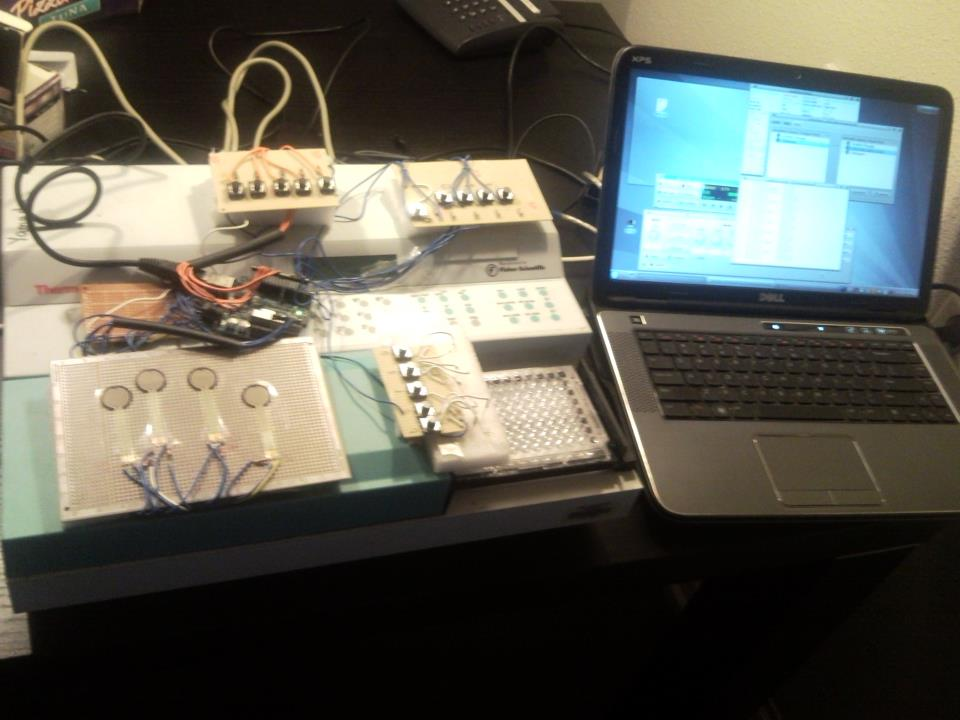
The Chromochord

Zayner self-identifies as a biohacker and believes in the importance of letting the general public participate in scientific experimentation, rather than leaving it segregated to labs. Zayner found the academic biohacking community to be exclusive and hierarchical, particularly with respect to the types of people who decide what is "safe". She hopes that their projects can let even more people experiment in their homes. Other scientists have responded that biohacking is inherently exclusive for its dependence on leisure time and money, and that deviance from general safety rules could lead to even harsher regulations for all. Zayner's public CRISPR kit campaign coincided with wider public scrutiny over genetic modification. Zayner maintained that these fears were based on misunderstandings of the product, as genetic experiments on yeast and bacteria cannot produce a viral epidemic. In April 2015, Zayner ran a hoax on Craigslist to raise awareness about the future potential of forgery in forensic genetic testing. In 2017 during the biotechnology conference SynBioBeta in San Francisco, Zayner publicly injected herself with CRISPR and is the first known person to do so. Zayner targeted the myostatin gene, which encodes a protein that inhibits muscle growth, acting as a natural regulator to prevent excessive muscle development. By using CRISPR technology, she aimed to "knock out" this gene in the muscle cells of her forearm. The intent was to disrupt the gene's function, potentially allowing for localized muscle growth. Zayner's CRISPR kit was displayed at the Cooper Hewitt's 2019 Nature Design Triennial.

In February 2016, Zayner attempted a full body microbiome transplant on herself, including a fecal transplant, to experiment with microbiome engineering and to see if she could treat her gastrointestinal and other health issues. The microbiome from the donor's feces successfully transplanted in Zayner's gut according to DNA sequencing done on samples. This experiment was documented by filmmakers Kate McLean and Mario Furloni and turned into the short documentary film Gut Hack.

In December 2016, Zayner created a fluorescent beer by engineering yeast to contain the green fluorescent protein from jellyfish. Zayner's company, The ODIN, released kits to allow people to create their own engineered fluorescent yeast, which was met with some controversy as the FDA declared that the green fluorescent protein can be seen as a color additive. Zayner views the kit as a way that an individual can use genetic engineering to create new things in their everyday life.

In 2019, Zayner launched a curriculum (Bioengineering 101 ) featuring a series of educational videos directed at those studying biotechnology for the first time. Zayner was featured in Unnatural Selection (stylized as "~~un~~natural selection"), a TV documentary series that presents an overview of genetic engineering, which was released on Netflix in October 2019.

In 2020, Zayner, David Ishee and Dariia Dantseva, who form a group of Biohackers named The Central Dogma Collective (CDC) tested a DNA based coronavirus vaccine on themselves and live-streamed the whole process and made all protocols and data open source and freely available to the public. The DNA vaccine expressed the SARS-CoV2 spike protein once inside human cells to elicit an immune response. She measured IgG and IgM spike protein antibody response and antibody neutralization of Spike protein RBD domain binding to the ACE2 receptor. All three individuals had an immune response and neutralization response to the vaccine.

== Art ==
In the arts, Zayner's work has been featured in the San Francisco Museum of Modern Art, Cooper Hewitt, Smithsonian Design Museum, Philadelphia Museum of Art and others.

While at the University of Chicago Zayner created a musical instrument, the Chromochord, which stimulates light-, oxygen-, and voltage-sensing proteins and translates their reactions into music. Together with composer Francisco Castillo Trigueros, Zayner received a grant from the university to compose music and create audio visual art installations using the work. Zayner, gave a musical performance using the Chromochord at NY MoMA PS1.

Zayner was a resident artist at Stochastic Labs in Berkeley, California where she worked with the new media artist Lynn Hershman Leeson to create an art installation about genetic engineering, which included a booth designed by Zayner that attempted to reverse engineer a person's DNA from their picture. The installation was shown at ZKM and Deichtorhallen.

== Medical investigation ==
The California Department of Consumer Affairs informed Zayner in May 2019 of their investigation into a complaint against her for practicing medicine without a license. By September of the same year Zayner received notice that the investigation had been concluded, and “no further action is anticipated.”

== Personal life ==
Zayner is transgender.
