= Niagara College Teaching Winery =

Canadian wine institution

Coordinates: 43.15039°N 79.16564°W

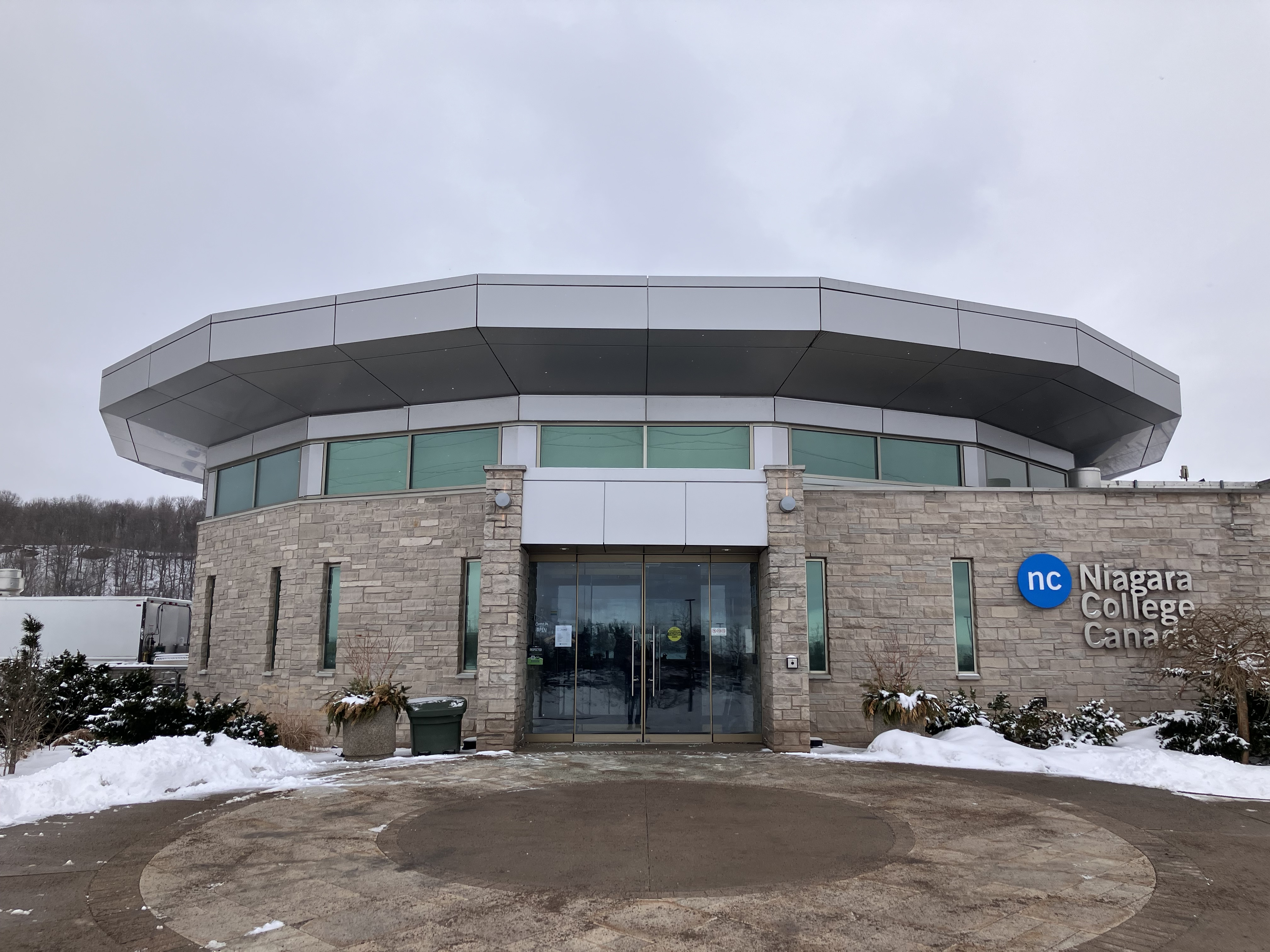
- The Niagara College Teaching Winery retail outlet building
- Type: College
- Established: 2002
- Affiliations: ACCC, VQA
- President: Sean Kennedy
- Undergraduates: Available
- Postgraduates: Certificate, Diploma
- Location: Niagara-on-the-Lake, Ontario, Canada
- Website: https://ncteachingwinery.ca/

The Niagara College Teaching Winery (NCT), Canada's first commercial teaching winery, is located at the Niagara-on-the-Lake Campus of Niagara College within the Niagara Region of Ontario. Situated in the heart of Niagara wine country, the NCTW is the centre for applied wine education for the Canadian wine industry. Officially opened in November 2002, the winery began production in 2001. With three on-site teaching and research vineyards, Winery and Viticulture students are taught the day-to-day responsibilities and inner workings of a winery, from planting grapes to selling wine. Students form teams dedicated to making a specific variety of wine. The Wine Business Management program provides students with expertise in the business, retail, marketing and export aspects of the growing wine industry. The facility operates strictly on a non-profit, cost-recovery basis with all revenue from sales reinvested into the winery program.

The campus is surrounded by an ecological band of wetlands, vineyards at the base of the Niagara Escarpment, a World Biosphere Reserve, which becomes a living laboratory for the programs. At the time of The War of 1812, the Black Swamp could be found where the campus stands today. With 38 acres (150,000 m^{2}) of production vineyards plus the Jack Forrer teaching and demonstration vineyard, the winery provides students with practical, hands-on training that prepares them for the workplace.

== Programs ==
- Winery and Viticulture Technician Diploma Program
- Beverage Business Management(Post-Graduate)
- Wine Industry Certificates

Winemaking I Certificate
Winemaking II Certificate
Viticulture/Vineyard Management Certificate
Wine Marketing and Management Certificate
Master Taster Certificate

Wine Industry Seminars and Workshops Niagara College Teaching Winery hosts various wine industry seminars and workshops. These workshops help to broaden knowledge and give training in related areas.

== Wine Sensory Laboratory ==
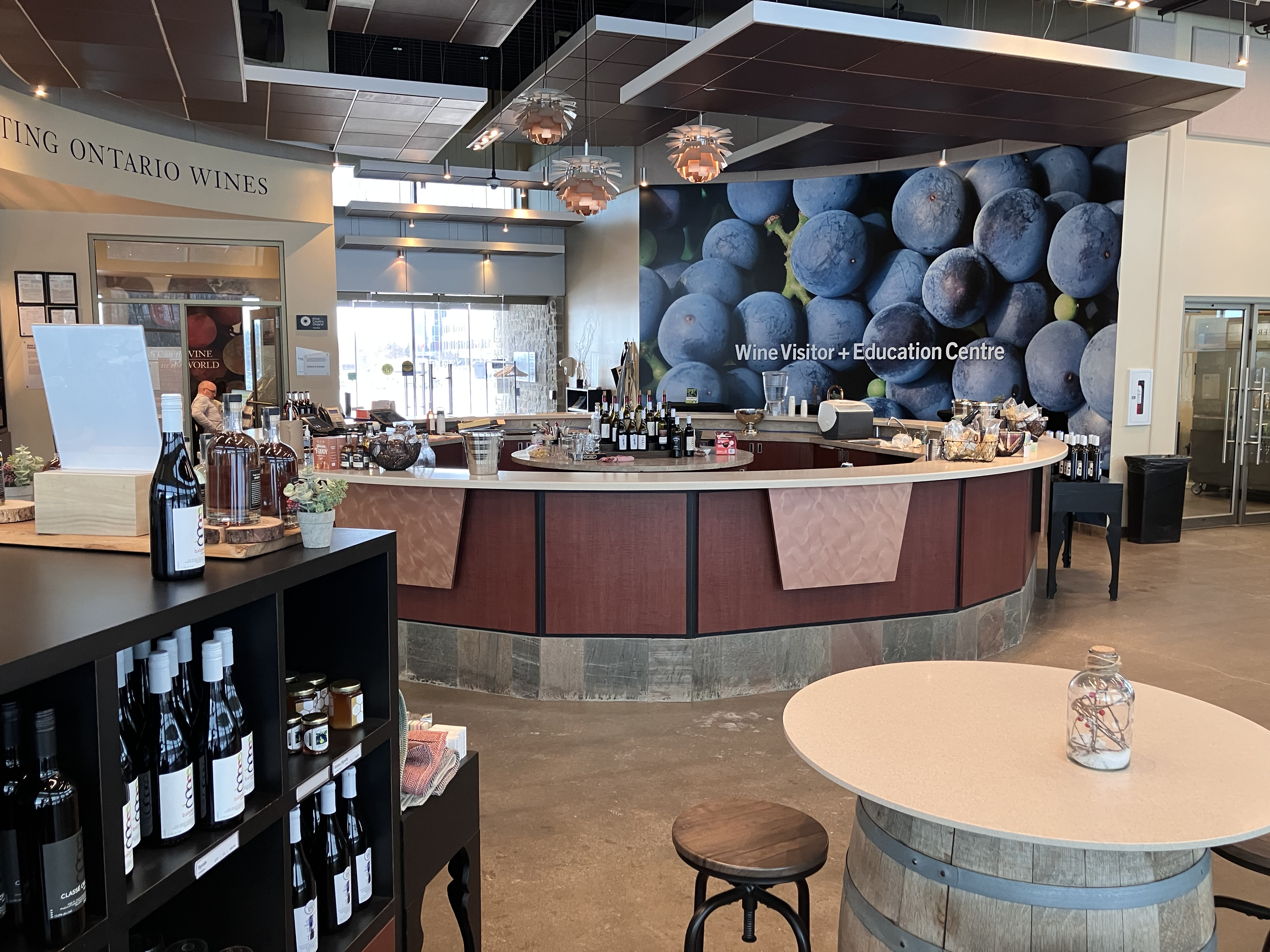
Tasting room of the Niagara College Teaching Winery

Completed in April 2007, the wine sensory lab enhances the training of students enrolled in wine and viticulture, sommelier, culinary and hospitality and tourism programs.
With 40 wine-tasting stations, recessed light tables and sinks, the theatre-style lab is designed to provide the appropriate physical and technical resources to assess and appreciate wine. The lab also includes a smaller, more traditional wine-tasting room often found at Ontario's wineries.

In 2007 the Sensory Lab was the site of a Vintner's Quality Alliance seminar focused on the production of quality wines for Ontario's winemakers.
The Niagara College Wine Sensory Lab, the first of its kind in wine country, is designed to focus attention on the wine. Allowing the taster to truly appreciate all aspects of Canadian wines.

== Events ==
The Niagara College Teaching Winery and its students participate in events around the country and the world. Annual Events include:

  - January/February: Niagara Icewine Festival
  - February/March: Cuveé
  - March: In Your Backyard Horticultural Open House
  - May: Wine & Herb Festival
  - June: New Vintage Festival
  - September: Niagara Grape & Wine Festival
  - October: Niagara Food Festival
  - November: Taste The Season

== Icewine ==
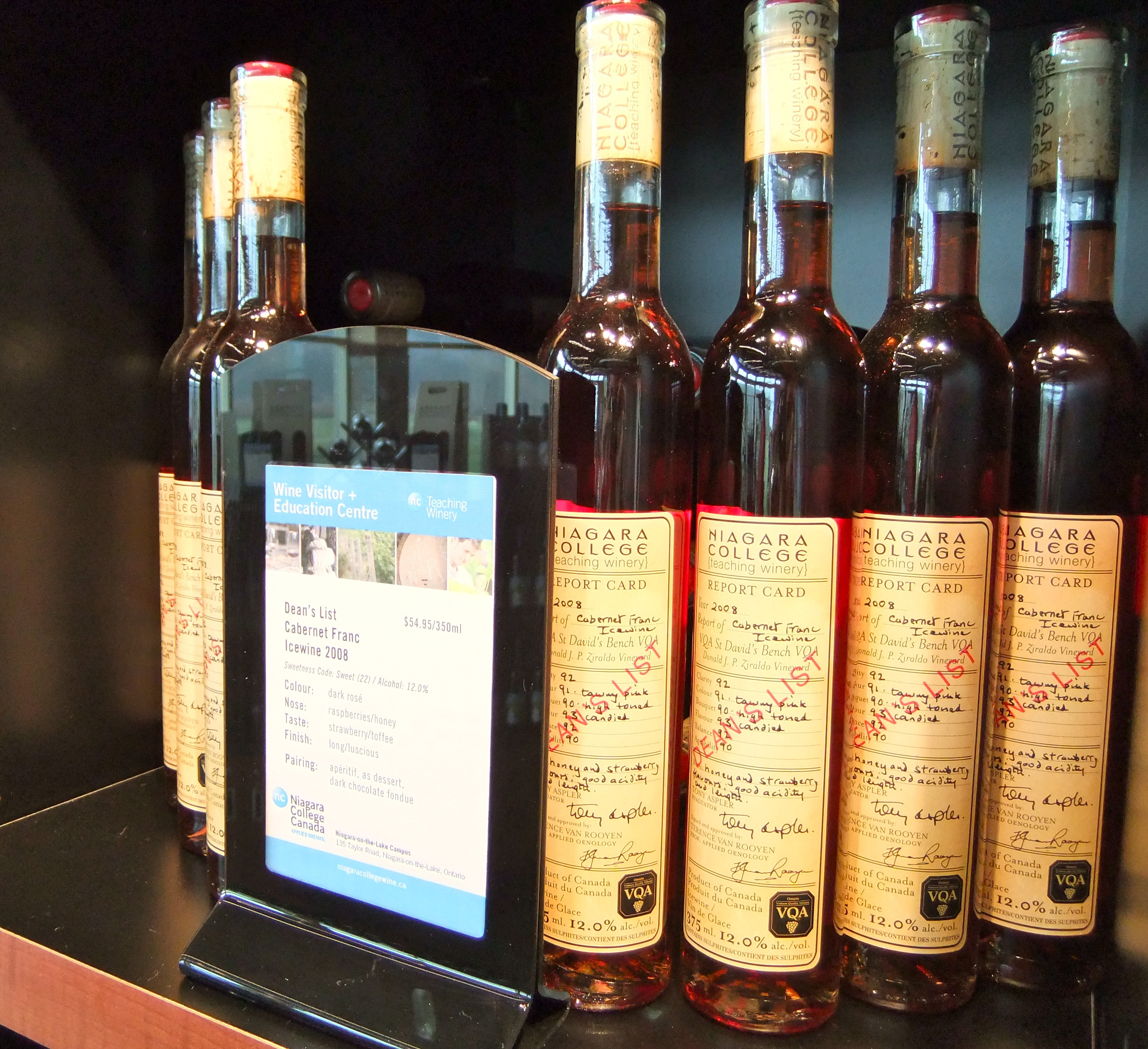
Winewine Created by Niagara College

NCT students experience the Icewine harvest first hand. With vineyards right on campus, students are called to pick the grapes when the optimum temperatures are reached. Students work through each step of the Icewine process from the vine right through the crush and up to the point of bottling. Many students are from foreign countries and distant areas of Canada and are proud to be part of making one of Canada's most internationally renowned products. Each year NCT Winery produces different varieties of Icewine, giving the students diverse knowledge of different styles. NCT Icewines are available at the Icewine gala, Icewine Festival and in the NCT Winery's own wine store during the month of January.

== Awards ==
NCT Winery has won more than 60 national and international awards for its VQA wines since its inception.
