= Samira Kiani =

Health systems engineer

- Education: Tehran University of Medical Sciences
- Known for: CRISPR
- Scientific career
- Workplaces: Massachusetts Institute of Technology; Arizona State University

Samira Kiani (Persian: سمیرا کیانی) is an associate professor in the department of Pathology of University of Pittsburgh School of Medicine and Pittsburgh Liver Research Center. Formerly, she was a Health Systems Engineer at Arizona State University. Her work combines Clustered Regularly Interspaced Short Palindromic Repeat (CRISPR) with synthetic biology. She is a 2019 AAAS Leshner Fellow.

== Early life and education ==
Kiani is from Iran. She earned her medical degree at the Tehran University of Medical Sciences. She completed a thesis on the molecular mechanisms of tissue injury. She joined the Freeman Hospital in Newcastle upon Tyne, where she was trained in general medicine. She joined the Massachusetts Institute of Technology, working as a postdoctoral researcher in synthetic biology at MIT Synthetic Biology Center. She has acted as an advisor for the MIT International Genetically Engineered Machine (iGEM) team. She collaborated with George Church and Ron Weiss to advance CRISPR technology. They developed a CRISPR based a modular transcriptional repression architecture that can be used to create functional cascaded circuits.

== Research and career ==
Kiani joined Arizona State University in 2016 and later moved to University of Pittsburgh in January 2020. She was awarded a DARPA fellowship to investigate hearing loss caused by traumatic injuries. The loud noises of combat zones can result in a health threat to military personnel. Kiani works on safer gene therapies, including Clustered Regularly Interspaced Short Palindromic Repeat (CRISPR). The Cas9 protein works to cleave DNA, and can be targeted using a gRNA. When the gRNA reaches the target site it performs a double strand break, enabling gene disruption or editing. The Kiani lab looks to control where and when this gene disruption occurs. She has investigated whether CRISPR could be used to restore hearing loss after acoustic trauma and aminoglycoside. She working on the optimisation of CRISPR gene editing using RNA pol II. She has discussed her work on the Future Tech podcast.

Her research is also supported by two grants from National Institute of Health, the most recent one being $2,600,000 from the National Institutes of Health. The proposal looks to develop a human liver-on-a-chip using CRISPR.

=== Public engagement ===
In 2019 Kiani was announced as a Leshner Fellow of the American Association for the Advancement of Science. She is working with Cody Sheehy to create a documentary entitled The Human Game. Kiani serves as the co-producer on the project, which looks to create a deeper discussion between the public and scientists about CRISPR technologies. In addition, together with Cody Sheehy, they are promoting a public engagement initiative called Tomorrow.Life aimed at increasing participation of broader stakeholders in decisions about future of science through collaborative visual story telling.
