= Niue Consumption Tax =

The Niue Consumption Tax (NCT) is a value-added tax or consumption tax for goods and services consumed in Niue. It is modelled on the New Zealand Goods and Services Tax and charged at a rate of 12.5%.

== History ==
The bill for the NCT was originally introduced to the Niue Assembly by Premier Toke Talagi November 2007, as Niue's tax system was not generating enough while committed to the Pacific Agreement on Closer Economic Relations requirement to progressively wipe import duties, but put on hold shortly afterwards after opposition from MPs. It was reintroduced a year later, and again delayed. It was finally passed on 5 February 2009, and came into force on 1 April 2009. The increased revenue from the NCT was partially offset by lowering income tax, import taxes, and tax on secondary income.
