= Matthew Porteus =

American professor of medicine

- Education: Harvard University; Stanford University
- Scientific career
- Workplaces: Stanford University; California Institute of Technology; Massachusetts Institute of Technology
- Thesis: Isolation and Characterization of TES-1/DLX-2: A Novel Homeobox Gene Expressed During Mammalian Forebrain Development (1994)

Matthew Hebden Porteus is Sutardja Chuk Professor of Definitive and Curative Medicine at Stanford University. In 2003, as a postdoctoral fellow in David Baltimore's lab at the California Institute of Technology, Porteus was the first to demonstrate precise gene editing in human cells using chimeric nucleases.

He graduated magna cum laude from Harvard University and completed his MD and PhD at Stanford University. For his post-doctoral work he trained with David Baltimore at MIT and Caltech. He is a scientific founder of CRISPR Therapeutics and an academic founder of Graphite Bio.

He has an h-index of 69 according to Google Scholar.
