= Wuchang University of Technology =

College in Wuhan, China

- 武昌理工学院
- Former names: Hubei Industry and Trade College, Wuhan University of Science and Technology Central South Branch
- Motto: 追求卓越，走向成功
- Motto in English: Chase after excellence, move towards success
- Party Committee Secretary: Wang Jiping
- Type: Private university
- Established: 1997
- Chairman: Peng Yuanjie
- President: Zhao Zuobin
- Vice-president: Cui Hairong
- Location: Wuhan, Hubei, 430223, China; 30°42′33″N 114°37′37″E
- Campus: 0.821 km^{2}
- Website: http://www.wut.edu.cn/

Chinese name
- Chinese: 武昌理工学院
Transcriptions
Standard Mandarin
- Hanyu Pinyin: Wǔchāng lǐgōng xuéyuàn

Wuchang University of Technology (formerly known as Hubei Industry and Trade College, Wuhan University of Science and Technology South Central Branch) is a full-time undergraduate college approved by the Chinese Ministry of Education. It is a private college located in Jiangxia District, Wuhan. The president is Zhao Zuobin.

== History ==
In early 1997, Hubei Guangxin Technology Education Development Co., Ltd. submitted an application to the former Hubei Provincial Education Committee to invest in the establishment of Hubei Industry and Trade College.

On September 5, 1997, the former Hubei Provincial Education Committee officially approved the establishment of the college.

On September 6, 1997, Hubei Guangxin Science and Technology Education Development Co., Ltd. issued a letter of appointment, appointing Zhao Zuobin as the president and legal representative of Hubei Industry and Trade College.

In 1997, Hubei Industry and Trade College was established.

On June 2, 1999, Wuhan University of Science and Technology and Hubei Industry and Trade College signed a joint school-running agreement to establish the Wuhan University of Science and Technology Vocational and Technical College "Industry and Trade Campus" at Hubei Industry and Trade College.

In September 2000, Hubei Guangxin Science and Technology Education Development Co., Ltd. acquired land at No. 18 Jiangxia Avenue, Miaoshan Development Zone, Jiangxia, Wuhan and began to build a new campus.

In January 2001, Hubei Guangxin Science and Technology Education Development Co., Ltd. and Wuhan University of Science and Technology formally signed the "Agreement on Establishing the Central South Branch of Wuhan University of Science and Technology".

On March 25, 2002, the Hubei Provincial Department of Education issued a document entitled "Approval for the Trial Operation of Wuhan University of Science and Technology Central South Branch", agreeing that Wuhan University of Science and Technology and Hubei Guangxin Science and Technology Education Development Co., Ltd. would cooperate in the trial operation of Wuhan University of Science and Technology Central South Branch. Enrollment began in 2002.

In February 2004, the Ministry of Education issued a document confirming Wuhan University of Science and Technology Central South Branch.

In May 2011, Wuhan University of Science and Technology Central South Branch was renamed "Wuchang University of Technology" with the school code 12310. At the same time, the establishment of Wuhan University of Science and Technology Central South Branch was abolished.

In 2019, Wuchang University of Technology passed the undergraduate teaching qualification evaluation of the Ministry of Education.
