= Henry Greely =

American lawyer

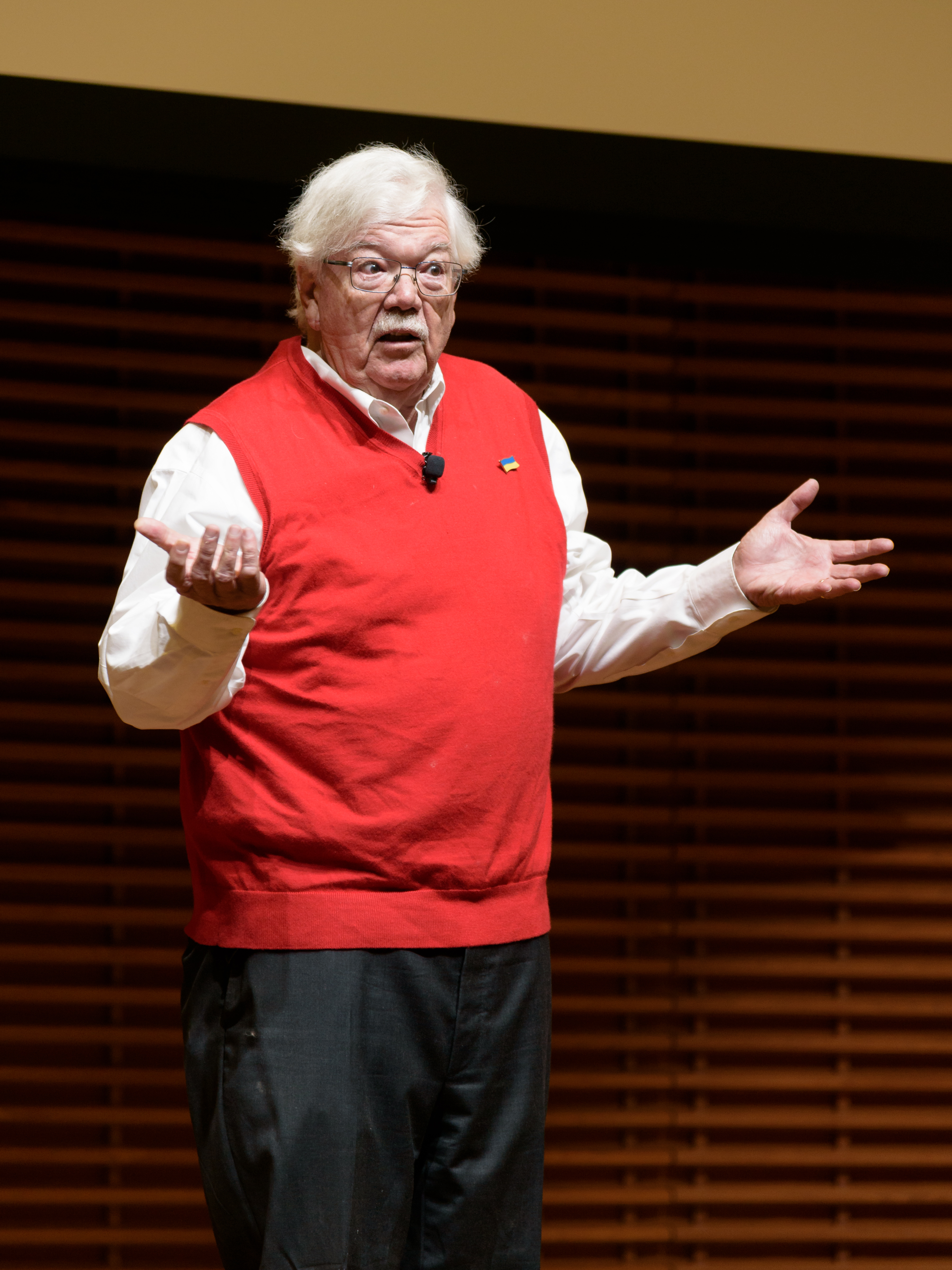
Hank Greely in 2024

Henry T. "Hank" Greely is an American lawyer, a leading authority on the ethical, legal, and social implications of new biomedical technologies, particularly those related to genetics, assisted reproduction, neuroscience and stem cell research.

Greely is the Deane F. and Kate Edelman Johnson Professor of Law, the Director of the Center for Law and the Biosciences, the Genetics Chair of the Steering Committee of the Center for Biomedical Ethics and the Director of the Stanford Program in Neuroscience and Society at Stanford Law School. He is an Elected Fellow of the American Association for the Advancement of Science.

== Books ==
The End of Sex and the Future of Human Reproduction by Henry T. Greely | 27 Apr 2018

CRISPR People: The Science and Ethics of Editing Humans by Henry T. Greely | 16 Feb 2021
