= Innovative Genomics Institute =

American nonprofit scientific research institute

- Founders: Jennifer Doudna and Jonathan Weissman
- Established: 2015; 11 years ago
- Focus: Gene editing, CRISPR, genomics, human health, sustainable agriculture, climate change
- President: Jennifer Doudna
- Key people: Jennifer Doudna, Bradley Ringeisen, Jillian Banfield, Fyodor Urnov, Alex Marson, Brian Staskawicz, Pamela Ronald
- Address: 2151 Berkeley Way, Berkeley, CA, 94720
- Location: University of California, Berkeley, Berkeley, California, US
- Coordinates: 37°52′27″N 122°16′00″W
- Interactive map of Innovative Genomics Institute
- Website: innovativegenomics.org

The Innovative Genomics Institute (IGI) is an American nonprofit scientific research institute founded by Nobel laureate and CRISPR gene editing pioneer Jennifer Doudna and biophysicist Jonathan Weissman. The institute is based at the University of California, Berkeley, and also has member researchers at the University of California, San Francisco, UC Davis, UC San Diego, UCLA, Lawrence Berkeley National Laboratory, Lawrence Livermore National Laboratory, Gladstone Institutes, and other collaborating research institutions. The IGI focuses on developing real-world applications of genome editing to address problems in human health, agriculture and climate change.

In addition to Doudna, current IGI directors and investigators include Jillian Banfield, who first introduced Doudna to CRISPR systems in bacteria in 2006, Fyodor Urnov, who coined the term "genome editing" with colleagues in 2005, as well as Alex Marson, Brian Staskawicz, and Pamela Ronald. The current executive director is Bradley Ringeisen, former director of the Biological Technologies Office at DARPA, who joined the IGI in 2020.

== History ==
The first paper demonstrating the use of CRISPR-Cas9 as a programmable genome editing tool was published in 2012 by Doudna, Emmanuelle Charpentier and colleagues, work that would result in Doudna and Charpentier being awarded the 2020 Nobel Prize in Chemistry. Around this time, for-profit companies started forming to commercialize CRISPR in various ways, including Caribou Biosciences, Editas Medicine, and CRISPR Therapeutics. While Doudna was involved in some of commercial ventures, she also felt that a nonprofit institute could play a unique role in driving the science forward and helping develop ethical guidelines and equitable access to gene-editing technology in ways that market-driven companies would not, particularly because CRISPR held so much promise for addressing rare diseases that had often been neglected by the pharmaceutical industry.

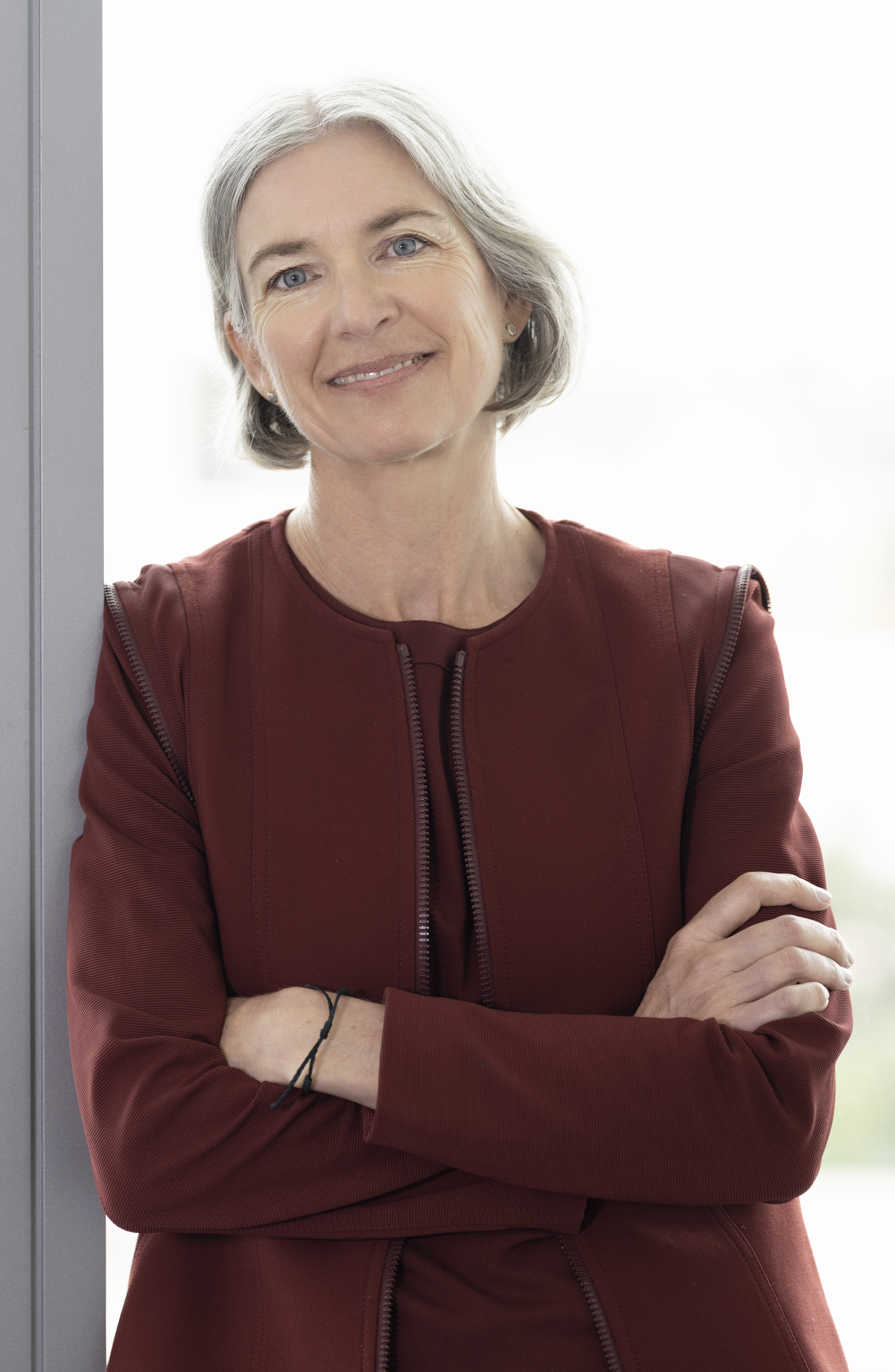
Jennifer Doudna at the Innovative Genomics Institute in 2021

The formation of the IGI was initially announced in March 2014 as the "Innovative Genomics Initiative", a partnership between UC Berkeley and UCSF researchers and biopharmaceutical industry partners with the aim of enhancing and genome-editing technology and applying it to drug development and global health, with funding support from the Li Ka Shing Foundation and the two universities. The official launch event was held on February 4, 2015. Early projects at the IGI focused on studying the use of CRISPR to address severe combined immunodeficiency disease and sickle cell disease. The IGI partnered with AstraZeneca and Agilent Technologies in 2015 to identify potential gene targets related to cancer, cardiovascular disease, autoimmune and inflammatory diseases, and other diseases with genetic components.

In January 2017, the IGI relaunched as the Innovative Genomics Institute and moved into their current building on the UC Berkeley campus. At the same time, new sources of funding allowed the institute expanded its scope to apply CRISPR and other genomic technologies to plants and agriculture, and the IGI brought in Brian Staskawicz as the director of this program. In early 2020, IGI co-founder Jonathan Weissman left UCSF and the IGI to take on the role of Landon T. Clay Professor of Biology at Whitehead Institute and professor of Biology at Massachusetts Institute of Technology.

On March 9, 2020, UC Berkeley announced the suspension in-person classes and began shutting down many campus buildings due to the COVID-19 pandemic. On March 13, 2020, Doudna convened a meeting with IGI leadership to discuss whether the institute should temporarily shut down. Instead, they decided to rapidly launch a diagnostic testing facility in the IGI building to provide testing to the UC Berkeley community as well as first responders and underserved populations in the surrounding cities. In addition to providing testing, the IGI awarded funding to support research studies into COVID-19 biology, epidemiology, public health impact, as well as novel diagnostics and therapeutic approaches. The IGI testing lab processed over 600,000 patient samples. Doudna has said that the IGI's experience with the COVID-19 response and rapid large-team science changed the way the institute selected projects moving forward because it showed how much impact can be made when researchers work together on a common goal.

On October 7, 2020, the Nobel Prize in Chemistry was awarded to Doudna and Charpentier for their work on developing CRISPR-Cas9 gene editing. Doudna was unable to attend the traditional live awards ceremony in Stockholm due to the COVID-19 pandemic, so she accepted the award at her home in Berkeley, California, and celebrations were held at the IGI building.

In October 2023, UC Berkeley announced plans to build a new "innovation zone" in downtown Berkeley with laboratory buildings that would provide new space for the IGI.

In May 2025, it was announced that physicians at the Children's Hospital of Philadelphia had collaborated with a team of IGI researchers led by Fyodor Urnov and Danaher Corporation to develop the first ever personalized gene editing therapy, a CRISPR base editing therapy that was designed, tested, manufactured, approved by the FDA, and administered to a newborn infant, KJ Muldoon, in just six months. After three infusions of the CRISPR therapy, Muldoon was discharged in June 2025, and took his first steps in late 2025.

== Research areas ==
IGI research centers around genome editing, incorporating researchers focused on human health applications, agricultural applications, development of genome-editing technology, and translation of lab discoveries into real-world solutions.

=== Advancing genome engineering ===
Since its founding, IGI researchers have discovered multiple new genome-editing proteins, expanding the toolkit beyond Cas9. The wave of discoveries of additional genome-editing tools with different properties, including new Cas proteins and techniques like base editing, was sometimes called "CRISPR 2.0" in popular science reporting. Ultra-compact proteins CasX and CasY were discovered by Jillian Banfield and collaborators at the IGI in some of the world's smallest microbes. Another compact Cas protein, CasΦ ("Cas phi"), was discovered by Banfield and Doudna and colleagues in the genomes of huge bacteriophages. Doudna and other IGI researchers have also advanced new techniques to improve non-viral and in vivo delivery of CRISPR-based therapeutics for medical applications, and worked on improving CRISPR safety and precision.

=== Human health ===
The IGI human health program has focused on developing therapies for rare and neglected genetic diseases and platform technology approaches to addressing rare diseases, including sickle cell disease and other blood and immune disorders. In 2021, the US Food and Drug Administration approved a clinical trial for an experimental CRISPR-based therapy for sickle cell disease developed by a consortium including the IGI, UCSF Benioff Children's Hospital, and the UCLA Broad Stem Cell Research Center. Other health research at the IGI focuses on cancer, neurodegenerative diseases, and clinical diagnostics.

In 2024, the IGI worked with the Children's Hospital of Philadelphia to develop a personalized CRISPR therapy for KJ Muldoon, a baby born with a rare fatal genetic disease affecting the urea cycle, which was approved and delivered to the patient in just six months. This event marked the first use of in vivo gene editing to repair a gene.

=== Climate and sustainable agriculture ===
Brad Ringeisen in conversation with Jennifer Doudna at the Inside IGI symposium at UC Berkeley in 2024 discussing the future of climate and agricultural applications of CRISPR gene editing.

The IGI sustainable agriculture program and its Plant Genomics and Transformation Facility has developed CRISPR protocols for editing over 30 common crop species, and has worked on developing applications including protecting the world's chocolate supply from cacao swollen shoot virus, removing toxic cyanide precursors in cassava, and improving drought tolerance in rice.

In 2022, the IGI launched new programs to apply genome editing and genomic technologies to the challenge of mitigating and adapting to climate change. This work included efforts to reduce agricultural emissions, capture atmospheric carbon, and help farmers adapt to changing conditions. The Chan Zuckerberg Initiative committed $11 million to the IGI to support research on CRISPR-based approaches to enhancing the ability of plants and soils to remove and sequester atmospheric carbon.

At the 2023 TED conference in Vancouver, it was announced that the IGI was selected for funding by the Audacious Project and the institute received $70 million from donors to develop microbiome editing tools that can be applied to real-world problems related to human health and climate change. The project, entitled "Engineering the Microbiome with CRISPR to Improve our Climate and Health," is initially targeting two problems caused by microbiomes, methane emissions from livestock, and childhood asthma.

=== Public impact ===
An IGI team focuses on public impact works across disciplines to shape the impact of genome-editing research on society through research in ethics, law, economics, and policy.

In a meeting with US senators in December 2018, Doudna was asked about the potential high cost of a CRISPR-based treatment of sickle cell disease and what could be done to bring these costs down. When she returned to the IGI following this meeting, she decided to make affordability a part of the mission of the IGI, and a key goal for its sickle cell initiative.

In 2022, the IGI convened a group of 30 experts from diverse fields, including biotech, economics, manufacturing, venture capital, and intellectual property, to develop a plan to improve the affordability of genetic medicines. Current gene therapies and genome editing therapies can cost in the range of $2 to $3 million per patient. The group developed a report entitled "Making Genetic Therapies Affordable and Accessible" that developed strategies for reducing the cost of genetic medicines by a factor of 10 through a combination of new funding models, improved manufacturing, and alternative IP licensing approaches.

== CRISPR education ==
In addition to CRISPR research, the IGI works to advance public understanding of CRISPR and genome engineering and guide the ethical use of these technologies. Free public resources include:

- CRISPRpedia — a free textbook-style resource for learning about the biology, applications, and ethics of CRISPR and genome editing, with chapters edited by Doudna, Urnov, Ronald, and other IGI investigators.
- CRISPR Made Simple — an educational guide to CRISPR for younger students and teachers.
- CasPEDIA — a wiki-style database of the known CRISPR-associated (Cas) proteins, their activity and use cases, launched in 2023 by a group of researchers at the IGI.
- CRISPR Clinical Trials — an annual summary of CRISPR-based therapies currently in clinical trials, broken down by disease area.
- CRISPR in Agriculture — a summary of the progress in developing CRISPR applications in food and agriculture.
