= Rybar =

Rybar may refer to:

- Rybar (surname), including Rybár (Slovak) and Rybář (Czech)
- Rybar, a popular Telegram channel operated by Russian milblogger Mikhail Zvinchuk

== See also ==
- Rebar (disambiguation)
- United States v. Rybar, a U.S. Court of Appeals case
