= Deepak Srivastava =

President and Senior Investigator, Gladstone Institutes

Deepak Srivastava (born May 14, 1966) is the president of Gladstone Institutes, where he is also a senior investigator and the Robert W. and Linda Mahley Distinguished Professor. Additionally, he is director of the Roddenberry Stem Cell Center at Gladstone. At UC San Francisco, with which Gladstone is affiliated, Srivastava is a professor in the Department of Pediatrics and the Department of Biochemistry and Biophysics. He is also the Wilma and Adeline Pirag Distinguished Professor in Pediatric Developmental Cardiology, and an attending physician in pediatric cardiology at UCSF Benioff Children's Hospitals.

Srivastava's laboratory focuses on understanding the causes of heart disease and on using knowledge of cardiac developmental pathways to devise novel therapeutic approaches for human cardiac disorders.

== Early life ==
Born in India, Srivastava immigrated to the United States with his father, a biochemist, his mother, a teacher, and his two older sisters when he was under one year of age. The family settled in Los Angeles, where Srivastava's father had joined the faculty at City of Hope Medical Center. Eight years later, they moved to Texas so his father could accept a professorship at the University of Texas Medical Branch in Galveston.

== Education and early career ==
Srivastava completed his schooling in Texas, earning a bachelor's degree in biochemistry at Rice University. Citing an early interest in medicine and wanting to help people, Srivastava went on to earn his medical degree at The University of Texas Medical Branch. It was during medical school that he became interested in genome regulation and its link to disease. He performed his residency in pediatrics at UC San Francisco and, mentored by notable professors such as Larry Shapiro, Abraham Rudolph, and Julien Hoffman, solidified an interest in pediatric cardiology.

Srivastava completed a fellowship in pediatric cardiology at Boston Children's Hospital of Harvard Medical School and then, inspired by the work of molecular biologist Eric Olson, completed a postdoctoral scientific fellowship in Olson's lab at MD Anderson Cancer Center. Together, they mapped key transcription factors directing heart development.

In 1996, Srivastava was appointed assistant professor, rising to professor, in the Departments of Pediatrics and Molecular Biology at UT Southwestern Medical Center in Dallas, Texas. He led his own lab there, discovering numerous genetic causes of heart disease, until being recruited to San Francisco in 2005 to direct the Gladstone Institute of Cardiovascular Disease and to be professor of pediatric cardiology at UC San Francisco. He was named president of Gladstone Institutes in 2018, becoming the third president in the organization's history.

== Leadership ==
After taking the helm at Gladstone, Srivastava began expanding the organization's scientific capabilities. He established the Gladstone Institute of Data Science and Biotechnology in 2018, recognizing the coming importance of artificial intelligence, and the Gladstone-UCSF Institute of Genomic Immunology in 2020. He recruited two scientists who went on to become Nobel laureates: stem cell expert Shinya Yamanaka and Jennifer Doudna, co-inventor of the CRISPR gene editing technology. He also added a number of early career scientists from varied disciplines to Gladstone's laboratory teams and appointed several outstanding women scientists to important leadership positions within Gladstone.

In 2022, Srivastava announced plans to further extend Gladstone's laboratory footprint, enabling addition of more than a dozen new labs and hundreds of new scientists, and enhancement of the organization's expertise in the areas of AI and immunotherapy. In 2024, the San Francisco Business Times named him one of the Bay Area's most admired CEOs and the Commonwealth Club World Affairs recognized him with the Distinguished Citizen Award.

== Research ==
Srivastava's research is focused on gene networks that guide development of the heart, seeking to understand how aberrations in these pathways can cause heart disease, and how they can be used to generate new cardiac cells to repair heart damage.

In studies that involved analyzing DNA from families with a history of congenital heart disorders, Srivastava and his team in 2003 discovered essential genes necessary for formation of specific chambers of the heart and revealed numerous genetic mutations that lead to conditions such as holes in the heart and valve disease. Using patient-specific stem cells, they also discovered mechanisms underlying adult degenerative valve disease. More recently, they leveraged machine learning to potential therapeutic approaches to treat this common condition.

Srivastava also pioneered the study of microRNAs in vertebrate biology, showing the important function of this class of genes in the development of the cardiovascular system.

In 2012, using knowledge from his discovery of genes that are important for heart development, Srivastava and his team reported in the journal Nature a method to convert scar-forming cells in animal hearts into new cardiac muscle-like cells, thereby regenerating damaged hearts from their own cells. In 2018, Srivastava discovered a way to regenerate adult heart tissue that had been scarred by a heart attack. His discovery was published in the scientific journal Cell and these discoveries were the basis for the formation of Tenaya Therapeutics, which now has potential new therapies advancing in clinical trials.

Srivastava also identified genetic mechanisms that explain why babies born to women with diabetes are five times more likely to have a congenital heart defect. The study, published in the scientific journal Nature Cardiovascular Research, provides a template for using single-cell-based studies to link environmental factors and birth defects more broadly.

Srivastava has published close to 250 peer-reviewed, highly cited articles, and trained more than 70 scientists now contributing independently. He has served as president of the International Society for Stem Cell Research and he has served on the editorial boards of scientific journals Cell and Cell Stem Cell.

== Commercial activities ==
Srivastava has co-founded two biotechnology companies: iPierian Inc., acquired by Bristol Myers Squibb in 2014, and Tenaya Therapeutics, which is developing therapies that address the underlying drivers of heart disease and is in clinical trials for three therapeutics. Srivastava serves on Tenaya's board of directors, as well as its scientific advisory board.

== Personal life ==
During his pediatric residency at UC San Francisco, Srivastava met and married Denise Maher, a nurse in the neonatal intensive care unit there. They had three children, Claire, Dillon, and Sydney, and spent more than 30 years together before she passed away unexpectedly in 2023. Srivastava lives in San Francisco.

== Awards and honors ==
- 2025 Bennett Family Award for Collaboration in the Science of Wellness, Issued by Global Wellness Summit
- 2025 American Heart Association Distinguished Scientist Lecturer
- 2024 Distinguished Citizen Award, Commonwealth Club World Affairs
- 2024 Most Admired CEO Award, San Francisco Business Times
- 2023 Distinguished Scientist Award, American Heart Association
- 2020 Distinguished Alumnus Award, Rice University
- 2017 Upstart 50 Inventor Award, San Francisco Business Times
- 2016 Andras Varro Award for Excellence in Cardiovascular Sciences, International Academy of Cardiovascular Sciences
- 2014 Elected member, National Academy of Medicine
- 2013 Pantheon Award for Scientific Achievement
- 2013 Outstanding Investigator Award, International Society for Heart Research
- 2011 Elected fellow, American Association for the Advancement of Science
- 2010 Elected member, American Academy of Arts and Sciences
- 2007 E. Mead Johnson Award, Society for Pediatric Research
