= Krogan (disambiguation) =

Krogan are a fictional alien race from the Mass Effect video game series.

Krogan may also refer to:

- Krogan, a character from Isle of Forgotten Sins
- Krogan, a character from DreamWorks Dragons

== People with the surname ==
- Nevan Krogan, a molecular biologist

=== Fictional ===
- Rachel and Stan Krogan, characters from The Story of Us
