= Dasso =

Dasso may refer to:

- Dasso, Benin, an arrondissement in Ouinhi, Benin

== People with the surname Dasso ==
- Andrés F. Dasso (1893–after 1930), Peruvian politician, mayor of Lima 1922–25
- Frank Dasso (1917-2009), American baseball player
- Mary Dasso, American biochemist
- Naldo Dasso (born 1931), Argentine equestrian
- Willy Dasso (born 1917), Peruvian Olympic basketball player

== See also ==
- Dassault, a France-based group of companies
- Dassow, a town in Mecklenburg-Western Pomerania, Germany
- Akatsuki no Dassō, Japanese film
- KJ2 Zukkoke Dai Dassō, album by the Japanese band Kanjani Eight
