= Sangamo Therapeutics =

American cell and gene therapy company

Coordinates: 37.67669°N 122.38421°W

- Type: Public
- Traded as: OTCQB: SGMO
- Industry: Biotechnology
- Founded: 1995
- Headquarters: Richmond, California, US
- Key people: Sandy Macrae (CEO)
- Revenue: ▲$111.3 million (2022)
- Operating income: ▲ -$201.281 million (2022)
- Net income: ▲$192.3 million (2022)
- Total assets: ▼$562.5 million (2022)
- Total equity: ▼$294.958 million (2022)
- Number of employees: 354
- Website: sangamo.com

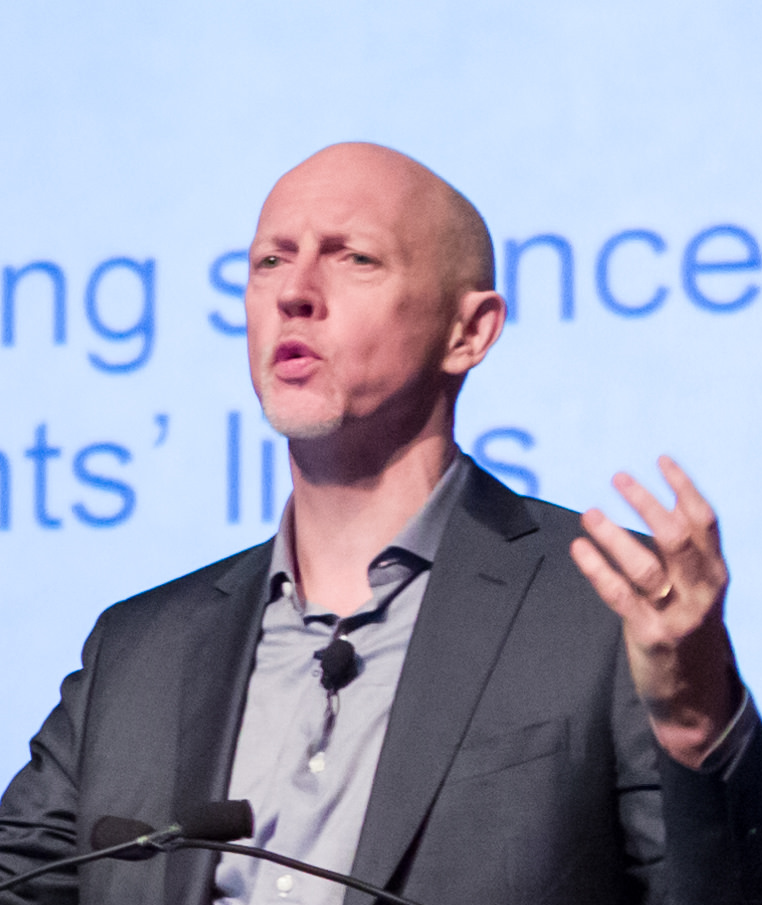
President and CEO Sandy Macrae in 2018

Sangamo Therapeutics, Inc. (formerly Sangamo Biosciences, Inc.) is an American biotechnology company based in Richmond, California, that develops cell and gene therapies for severe genetic diseases.

== History ==
The company was founded in 1995 in Richmond, California. It was originally known as Sangamo Biosciences, Inc. before changing its name in 2017. In September 2018, it had 182 employees. Alexander (Sandy) Macrae, a physician-scientist who previously held senior roles at Takeda Pharmaceuticals and GlaxoSmithKline, is Sangamo's CEO and president.

Sangamo Therapeutics' Sangamo name and, for a brief time, its logo, were taken from the earlier Sangamo Electric Company, founded as an offshoot of the Illinois Watch Company in January 1899, the name coming from the nearby Sangamon River. The modern Sangamo's founder, Edward Oliver Lanphier II, is the great-grandson of one of Sangamo Electric's founders, Robert Carr Lanphier Sr.

In June 2026, Sangamo filed for Chapter 11 bankruptcy, retaining Raymond James & Associates as its restructuring advisor. Its bankruptcy petition estimated assets and liabilities each between $100 million and $500 million.

In August 2026, via court-supervised Section 363 auctions, PTC Therapeutics acquired Sangamo's Fabry disease program for $111 million upfront and up to $100 million in potential milestone payments, and Eli Lilly & Co. acquired Sangamo's prion disease program along with its capsid delivery, zinc finger, and modular integrase platforms for $50 million.

== Research ==
Sangamo's clinical development programs have emerged from proprietary zinc finger and serine integrase gene editing technologies that the company has developed, coupled with its proprietary adeno-associated virus (AAV)-based delivery platform. The company's clinical pipeline includes investigational treatments for haemophilia A; lysosomal storage diseases including Fabry disease, mucopolysaccharidosis type I (Hurler Syndrome), and mucopolysaccharidosis type II (Hunter Syndrome); and neurological disorders including small fiber neuropathy (SFN) and prion disease.

The FDA granted Sangamo fast track designation for Giroctocogene fitelparvovec (formerly known as SB-525), a gene therapy candidate for haemophilia A. In its partnership with Pfizer in 2017, Sangamo uses Bioverativ in hemoglobinopathies such as beta thalassemia and sickle cell disease.

In February 2019, medical scientists, working with Sangamo Therapeutics, announced the first ever "in body" human gene editing therapy to permanently alter DNA - in a patient with Hunter syndrome. As of February 2019 clinical trials by Sangamo involving gene editing using zinc finger nuclease were ongoing.

== Clinical trials ==
Sangamo's programs are a mix of wholly owned and partnered; major partners include Pfizer, Biogen, Sanofi, Takeda, and Kite (a Gilead company).

As of 2020 Sangamo had the following clinical trials underway in the US:

- Phase 1/2 Thales study in beta thalassemia
- Phase 1/2 STAAR study in Fabry disease
- Phase 1/2 PRECIZN-1 study in sickle cell disease
- Phase 1/2 CHAMPIONS study in MPS II
- Phase 1/2 EMPOWERS study in MPS I
- Phase 1/2 Alta study in hemophilia A
- Phase 1 FIXTENDZ study in hemophilia B

In February 2023, Sangamo Therapeutics announced that it would stop the late-stage development for the Phase 1/2 PRECIZN-1 study of BIVV003 its sickle cell drug.

== See also ==
- Alan Wolffe
- Edward Rebar
- Fyodor Urnov
