= Pamela Ronald =

American geneticist

Pamela Christine Ronald
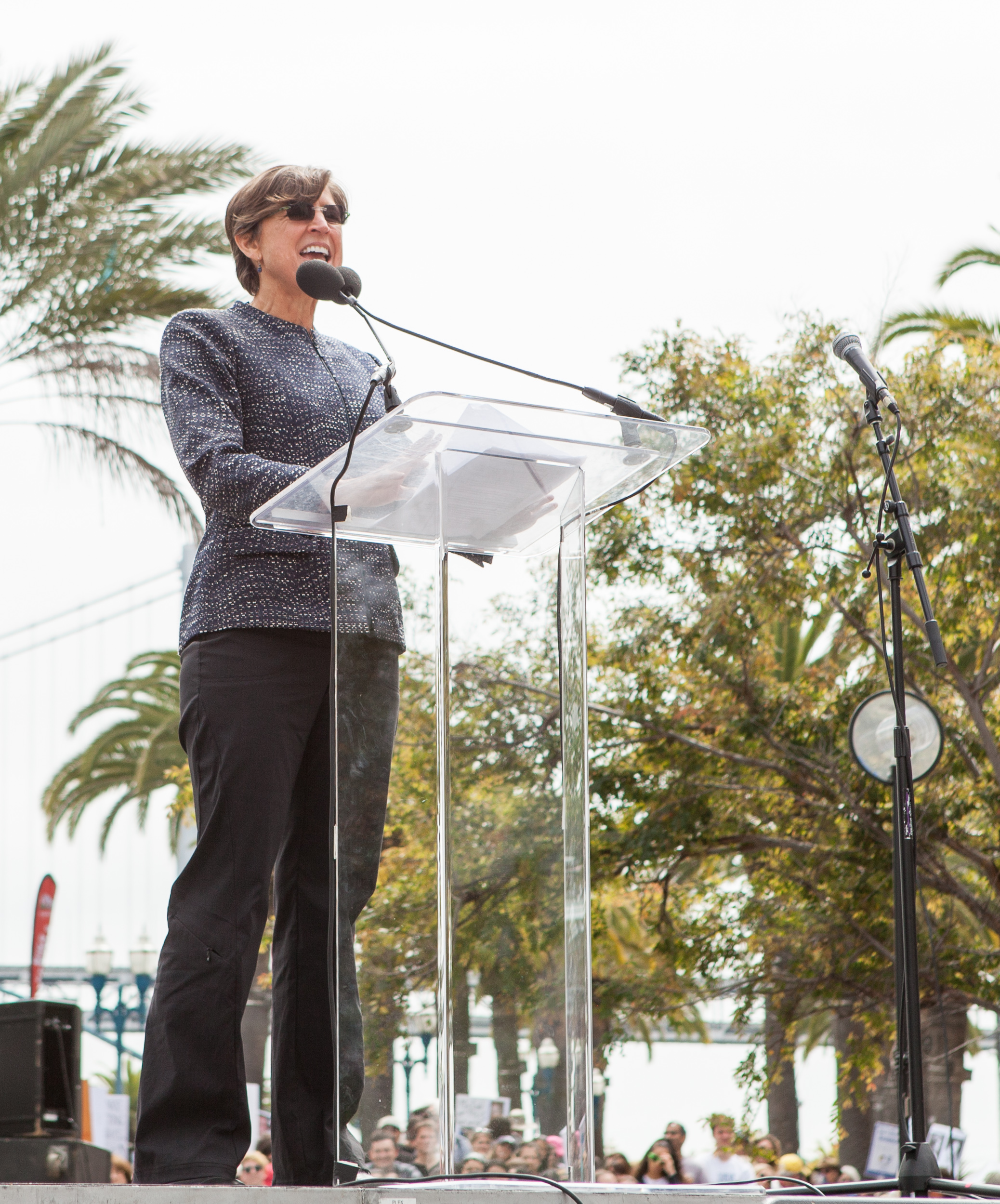
- Born: January 29, 1961 (age 65); San Mateo County, California, U.S.
- Education: Reed College (B.A.); Stanford University (M.A.); Uppsala University (M.S.); UC Berkeley (Ph.D.)
- Scientific career
- Fields: Plant biology, Microbiology, Genetics
- Workplaces: University of California, Davis
- Doctoral advisor: Brian Staskawicz
- Website: cropgeneticsinnovation.ucdavis.edu

Pamela Christine Ronald (born January 29, 1961) is an American plant pathologist and geneticist. She is a professor in the Department of Plant Pathology and conducts research at the Genome Center at the University of California, Davis and a member of the Innovative Genomics Institute at the University of California, Berkeley. She also serves as Director of Grass Genetics at the Joint BioEnergy Institute in Emeryville, California. In 2018 she served as a visiting professor at Stanford University in the Center on Food Security and the Environment.

Her laboratory has genetically engineered rice for resistance to diseases and tolerance to flooding, which are serious problems of rice crops in Asia and Africa. Ronald's research has been published in Science, Nature and other leading peer-reviewed scientific journals, and has also been featured in The New York Times, Organic Gardening Magazine, Forbes Magazine, The Wall Street Journal, The Progressive Farmer, CNN, Discover Magazine, The Scientist, Popular Mechanics, Bill Gates blog, National Public Radio and National Geographic.

== Early life and education ==
External media

Audio
- "Episode 203: Genetic Engineering and Organic Farming: An Unexpected Marriage" (includes interview with Pamela C. Ronald and Raoul Adamchak), Science History Institute

Video
- "Pamela Ronald: The Case for Engineering our Food", TED Talks
- "GMOrganic: A Botanical Love Story"

Pamela Christine Ronald was born on January 29, 1961, to Patricia (née Fobes) and Robert Ronald of San Mateo, California. Robert Ronald, a Jewish refugee who was born Robert Rosenthal, wrote a memoir entitled Last Train to Freedom. From an early age, Ronald spent time backpacking in the Sierra Nevada wilderness, sparking her love for plant biology. Ronald realized that analyzing and studying plants could be a profession after witnessing botanists in the field during a summer time hike with her brother. She already knew she loved plants after time spent helping her mother tend to them in the garden.

As a student at Reed College with Helen Stafford (1922–2011), Ronald became intrigued by the interactions of plants with other organisms. For her senior thesis, she studied the recolonization of Mount St. Helens. Ronald received a B.A. in Biology from Reed College in 1982.

She went on to earn an M.A. in Biology from Stanford University in 1984 and an M.S. from Uppsala University, Sweden in plant physiology in 1985. As a Fulbright Scholar in Sweden with Nils Fries, she studied how plants interact with mycorrhizal fungi.

As a graduate student at UC Berkeley, she began to study plant-bacterial interactions in the laboratory of Brian Staskawicz, working with peppers and tomatoes. Because rice is the most important food staple in the world, she switched her studies to rice, hoping to contribute to the well-being of farmers in impoverished regions of the world. She received her Ph.D. in molecular and physiological plant biology in 1990. She was a postdoctoral fellow at Cornell University from 1990 to 1992 in the laboratory of Steven Tanksley.

In 1996 she married Raoul Adamchak, an organic farmer. They have two children, Cliff and Audrey.

== Career and research ==
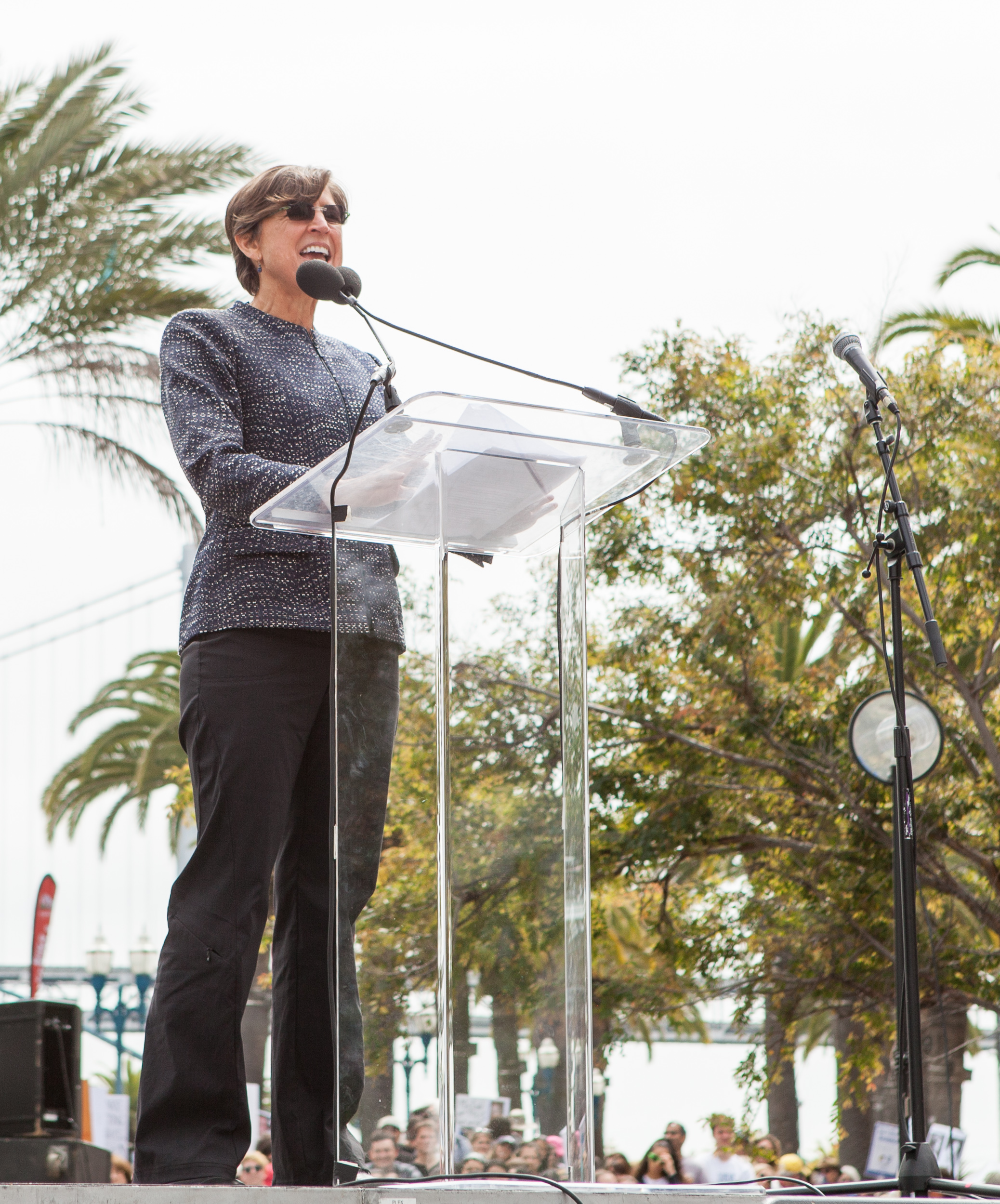
Speaking at the March for Science San Francisco, April 2017

In 1992, Ronald joined UC Davis as a faculty member. From 2003 to 2007 Ronald chaired the UC Davis Distinguished Women in Science seminar series, an event designed to support women's professional advancement in the sciences. She served as Faculty Assistant to the Provost from 2004 to 2007.

Ronald is a vocal advocate for science and for sustainable agriculture. Her laboratory has been instrumental in the development of rice that is disease-resistant and flood-tolerant.

=== Xa21: Pattern recognition receptor-mediated immunity ===
The Ronald laboratory studies the innate immune response, using the host organism rice and the agriculturally important pathogen Xanthomonas oryzae pv. oryzae (Xoo). In the 1990s, through conversations with rice geneticist Gurdev Khush, Ronald became interested in the rice XA21 genetic locus, which conferred broad-spectrum resistance to Xoo. She hypothesized that Xa21 encoded a single protein that recognized a conserved microbial determinant.

In 1995, the Ronald laboratory isolated and characterized the rice XA21 pattern recognition receptor. Subsequent discoveries in flies, humans, mice, and Arabidopsis revealed that animals and other plant species also carry membrane-anchored receptors with striking structural similarities to XA21 and that these receptors also play key roles in the immune response. For their discoveries of the fly and mice receptors, Jules A. Hoffmann and Bruce Beutler received the 2011 Nobel Prize in Physiology or Medicine (jointly with Ralph Steinman), indicating the importance of such research.

This work resulted in part from the identification of a blight-resistant rice strain from Mali, Oryza longistaminata, in the late 1970s. The strain was studied and bred at the International Rice Research Institute (IRRI) in Los Baños, Philippines. Ronald's group subsequently mapped, sequenced, and cloned the Xa21 gene from this rice strain. When US patent 5859339 was granted to the University of California for the XA21 gene, Ronald and law professor John Barton established a benefit-sharing model for the source countries of genetically important plant varieties called the Genetic Resources Recognition Fund. Ronald also launched a project with CGIAR to allow noncommercial use of the gene for nonprofit purposes and released the gene to IRRI for the development of rice strains to be grown in developing nations.

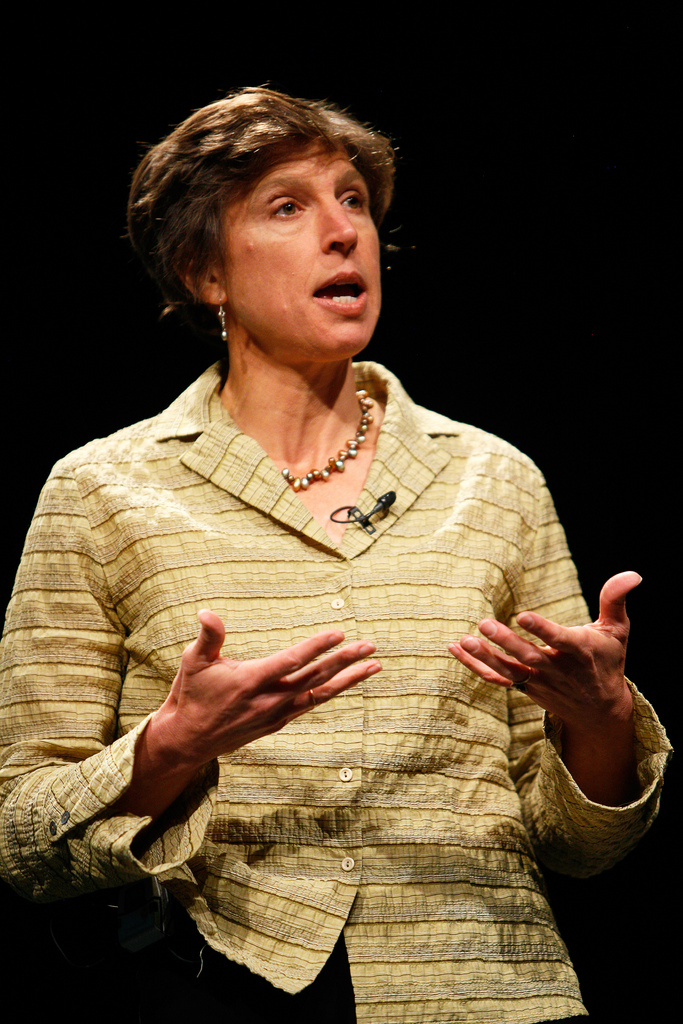
Dr. Ronald at Pop!Tech 2008

==== Paper retraction ====
In 2009 and 2011, Ronald's laboratory reported on the discovery of a bacterial protein that they believed was the activator of Xa21-mediated immunity. These reports were described by ScienceWatch as "hot" and "highly cited". In 2013, Ronald retracted both scientific papers, notifying the scientific community that two bacterial strains had been mixed up. The error was discovered when new laboratory members Rory Pruitt and Benjamin Schwessinger were unable to replicate previous results. As a result, the laboratory carried out a lengthy and painstaking process, re-confirming the genotypes of all the laboratory strains in their collection. Examination of the bacterial strains and rice seed stocks indicated that one of the bacterial strains involved in key experiments had been mislabeled. Researchers also discovered that results of one of the tests that had been performed were highly variable. In a blog post at Scientific American, Ronald describes the 18-month process leading to the retraction. The retractions were also reported on by The Scientist. Retraction watch, a website that shines light on problems with papers and educates and celebrates research ethics and good practices stated, "that this was a case of scientists doing the right thing". As part of a story about the importance of setting the record straight, in 2014, Nature magazine also covered the Ronald retraction.

==== RaxX, the activator of Xa21-mediated immunity ====
For two more years Ronald's laboratory repeated critical experiments and carried out new ones. In redoing their work, they introduced new procedures and controls to ensure that they were getting it right. Ronald reports that she was amazed not only by the perseverance and loyalty of her team, but also by the community support that she received during this difficult time. In 2015, Ronald published the discovery of the predicted ligand of XA21, a sulfated peptide called RaxX, correcting their mistake and bringing the research team full circle.

=== Genetic Resources Recognition Fund ===
Ronald has sought ways to recognize source nations and institutions that have contributed to important scientific advances, such as the West African country of Mali, the source of the Xa21 rice gene. Working with law professor John Barton, Ronald tried to establish a benefit-sharing model for the source countries of genetically important plant varieties. In 1996, Ronald founded the Genetic Resources Recognition Fund (GRRF) at UC Davis. The intention of the fund was to collect payments from the licensing of academic discoveries that utilized plant materials from developing countries, and to redistribute those monies to source countries through fellowships, land conservation efforts, or other projects of benefit to nation partners.

=== Sub1: Tolerance to abiotic stress ===
In 1996, Ronald began a project with rice breeder David Mackill who had recently demonstrated that tolerance to complete submergence mapped to the Submergence tolerance 1 (Sub1) Quantitative trait locus (QTL). In 1997, the USDA awarded Ronald and Mackill a grant to isolate the Sub1 locus. Ronald's laboratory led the positional cloning of the Sub1 QTL, revealed that it carried three ethylene response transcription factors (ERF) and demonstrated that one of the ERFs, which she designated Sub1A, was upregulated rapidly in response to submergence and conferred robust tolerance to submergence in transgenic plants . This work revealed an important mechanism with which plants control tolerance to abiotic stress and set the stage for in-depth molecular-genetic analyses of Sub1A-mediated processes with her collaborator Julia Bailey-Serres, who joined the project in 2003. Mackill's team at the International Rice Research Institute (IRRI) generated and released several Sub1A varieties (developed through marker-assisted breeding) in seven countries including India, Indonesia and Bangladesh, where submergence destroys four million tons of rice each year, enough to feed 30 million people. With support from the Bill and Melinda Gates Foundation, Sub1 rice has reached over six million farmers as of 2017.

== Public engagement ==
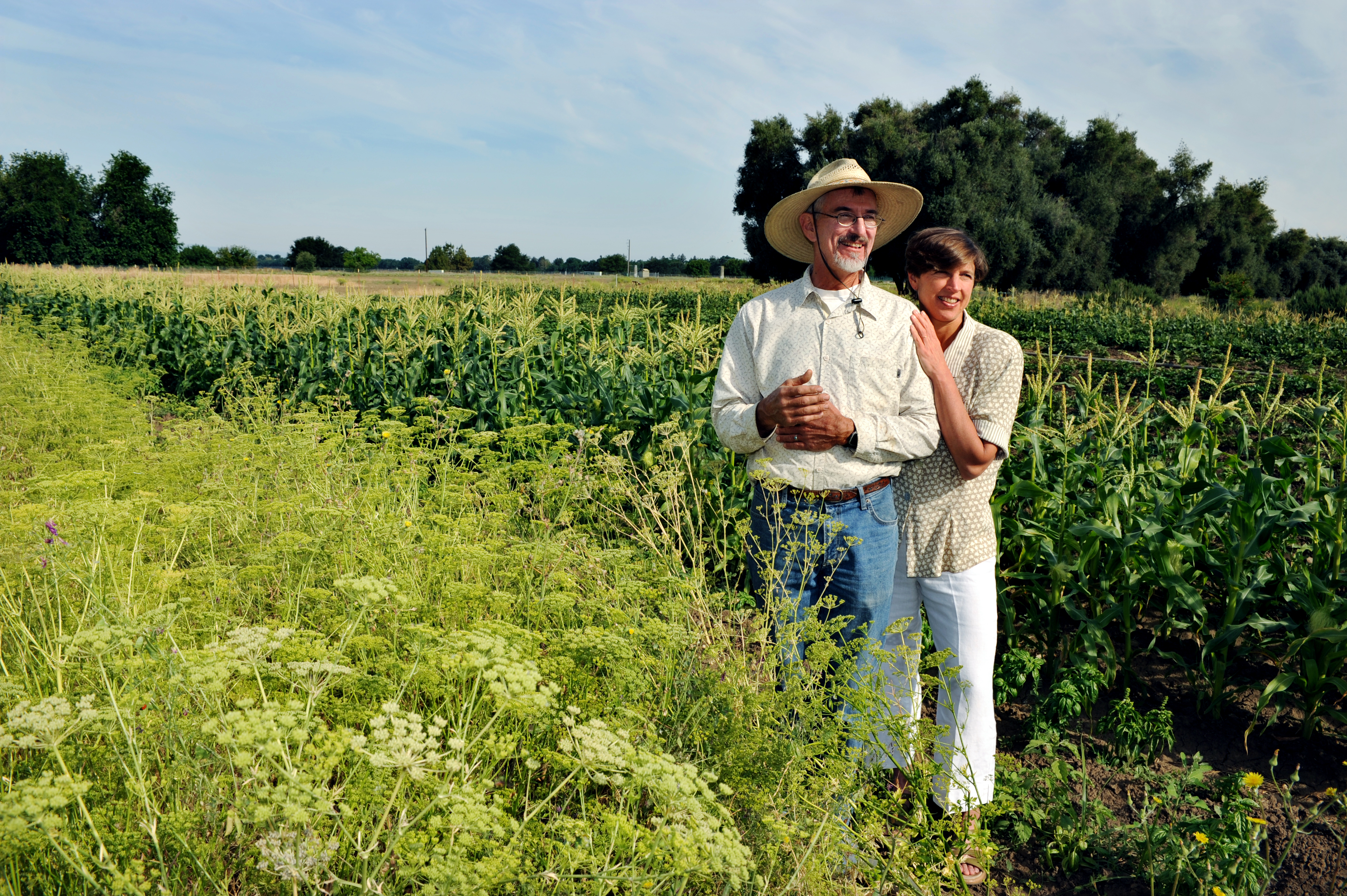

Ronald co-authored the book Tomorrow's Table: Organic Farming, Genetics and the Future of Food with her husband, Raoul Adamchak. Tomorrow's Table was selected as one of the best books of 2008 by Seed Magazine and the Library Journal. Bill Gates calls the book "a fantastic piece of work" and "important for anyone that wants to learn about the science of seeds and challenges faced by farmers." This book describes how genetically engineered crops are made and provides helpful tips about organic farming and crop production in general.

In addition to her scholarly publications, Ronald has written for The New York Times, The Boston Globe, Forbes Magazine, Scientific American, The Harvard International Review, The Economist, the Boston review and the MIT Technology Review.

== Affiliations ==
Ronald serves on several institute boards, advisory committees and editorial boards, including Current Biology, the PLOS Biology Editorial Board, and the Editorial Board of the Proceedings of the National Academy of Sciences. She is a Member of the National Academies' Committee on Understanding and Addressing Misinformation about Science and a founding Member of the Advisory Council of the National Food Museum. She serves as chair of the Scientific and Technological Committee, Priority Research and Equipment Programme in Advanced Plant Breeding, at the French National Research Agency. In 2025, Ronald joined the National Academy of Sciences's Board on Agriculture and Natural Resources (BANR) to provide advice on requests and inquiries from Congress, federal, and state agencies and identify frontiers of science and policy in the food, agricultural, and natural resources system.

Ronald is a former Chair of Section G, Biological Sciences, of the American Association for the Advancement of Science, and of the American Society of Plant Biology Public Affairs Committee. She is also former member of the John Innes Centre Science and Impact Advisory Board, the Donald Danforth Plant Science Center Scientific Advisory Board and the Boyce Thompson Institute for Plant Biology Scientific Advisory Board. In 2024, Ronald participated in The Rockefeller Foundation's Bellagio Center Residency, where she developed strategies to optimize carbon transfer from plants to soil mineral-microbial complexes.

== Awards and honors ==
With her collaborators, Ronald received the 2008 USDA National Research Initiative Discovery Award & the 2012 Tech Award for the innovative use of technology to benefit humanity. Ronald was named a National Geographic Innovator and one of Grist's 50 innovators who will lead us toward a more sustainable future. She received the Louis Malassis International Scientific Prize for Agriculture and Food, and was named one of the world's 100 most influential people in biotechnology by Scientific American. Her 2015 TED talk has been viewed more than 2 million times. In 2019, she received the American Society of Plant Biologists Leadership Award and an honorary doctorate from the Swedish Agricultural University. In 2020 she was named a World Agricultural Prize Laureate by the Global Confederation of Higher Education Associations for Agricultural and Life Sciences. In 2022 she was awarded the Wolf Prize in Agriculture and the VinFuture Prize for outstanding female innovator. In 2025, she received an honorary doctorate from the Hebrew University of Jerusalem and the Stanford President's Award for the Advancement of the Common Good, which celebrates the work and commitment of alumni making a positive difference in their communities and the world. Ronald is an elected member of the U.S. National Academy of Sciences, the American Academy of Arts and Sciences, the Royal Swedish Academy of Agriculture and Forestry and, as of 2025, the French Academy of Agriculture .

=== Chronological list of honors ===
- 1984–1985, Fulbright Fellow
- 1999–2000, Guggenheim Fellowship
- 2006 Elected Fellow of the American Association for the Advancement of Science (AAAS)
- 2006 Fellow at the Davis Humanities Institute
- 2008 Fellow, Japan Society for the Promotion of Science (JSPS)
- 2008 USDA National Research Initiative Discovery Award
- 2008 Tomorrow's Table selected as one of SEED Magazine's Best Books of 2008, Library Journal's Best Sci-Tech Books of 2008
- 2009 Science in Society Journalism Award from the National Association of Science Writers in Society for her commentary "The New Organic" of March 16, 2008, on the Boston Globe website
- 2011 Charles Valentine Riley lecturer (Selected by the AAAS, US National Academies, Riley Foundation and the World Food Prize Committee)
- 2011 Fast Company magazine named Ronald one of the 100 most creative people.^{[73]}
- 2012 Fulbright-Tocqueville Distinguished Chair Award, Université de Montpellier 2 and the Institut de Recherche pour le Développement
- 2012, Louis Malassis International Scientific Prize for Agriculture and Food
- 2012 The Tech Award: Technology Benefiting Humanity
- 2012 Tomorrow's Table selected by the New Earth Archive Booklist as one of the 25 books selected in 2012 that educate, inspire, and drive change
- 2015 Selected by National Geographic as an innovator who is transforming her field of research "by creating, educating, provoking, and delighting"
- 2015 Scientific American named Ronald one of the World's 100 most influential people in biotechnology
- 2016 Named one of the 50 innovators and visionaries who will lead us toward a more sustainable future by Grist magazine
- 2016 Ronald named Breakthrough Fellow
- 2019 Elected Member, National Academy of Sciences
- 2019 Honorary Doctorate, Swedish University of Agricultural Sciences
- 2022 Wolf Prize in Agriculture
- 2022 Elected to the Royal Swedish Academy of Agriculture and Forestry
- 2023 Paradigm Award, The Breakthrough Institute
- 2024 Selected for a Bellagio Residency, Rockefeller Foundation
- 2024 Laureate Distinguished Fellow, International Engineering and Technology Institute
- 2025 Honorary Doctorate, Hebrew University of Jerusalem
- 2025 The President's Award for the Advancement of the Common Good, Stanford University
