= Fyodor Urnov =

Russian-American biologist

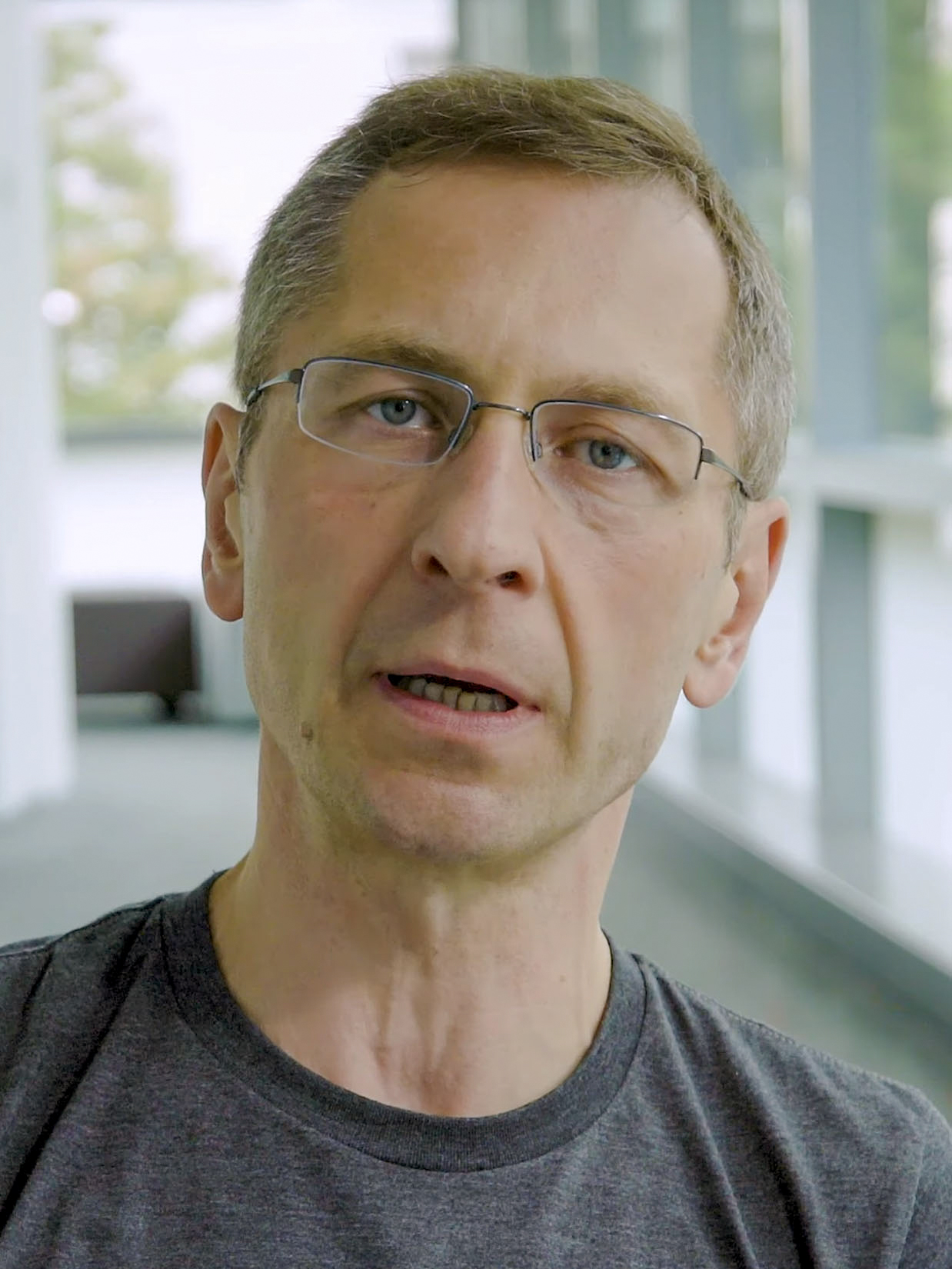
- Born: Фёдор Урнов; 1968 (age 57–58); Russian SFSR
- Education: Moscow State University; Brown University
- Known for: Genome editing
- Scientific career
- Workplaces: Sangamo Therapeutics; UC Berkeley
- Academic advisors: Susan Gerbi

Fyodor Dmitriyevich Urnov (Russian: Фёдор Дми́триевич Урнов; born 1968) is a Russian-born biomedical researcher who has played a leading role in the field of genome editing. He is a Professor of Genetics, Genomics, and Development at the University of California, Berkeley and Director of the Center for Translational Genomics at the university's Innovative Genomics Institute. In 2005 Urnov and his colleagues coined the term "genome editing" and demonstrated the first use of ZFNs to edit DNA in human cells. Urnov is considered a pioneering figure in the field of genome editing and his work has been cited widely.

== Early life and education ==
Fyodor Urnov was born in Soviet Russia to a linguist mother and a literary critic father. He was raised in Moscow. Urnov's father frequently purchased him books; on his 12th birthday, Urnov received a copy of James D. Watson's book The Double Helix. The book helped to spark Urnov's early interest in life sciences.

Urnov attended Moscow State University, where he received his undergraduate degree in biology in 1990. Following the fall of the Iron Curtain, Urnov applied to graduate schools in the United States. He attended Brown University for doctoral studies where he worked as a researcher in the laboratory of Susan Gerbi. He received his Ph.D. from Brown in 1996.

== Career ==
After graduating, Urnov worked with DNA in the laboratory of Alan Wolffe at the National Institutes of Health. In 2000, Urnov followed Wolffe to Sangamo Therapeutics where Wolffe had been recruited as Chief Scientific Officer. Shortly after moving to the San Francisco Bay Area, Urnov was offered an adjunct position as a lecturer at the University of California, Berkeley.

In 2005 Urnov's team at Sangamo demonstrated the first use of ZFNs to edit DNA in human cells and coined the term "genome editing."

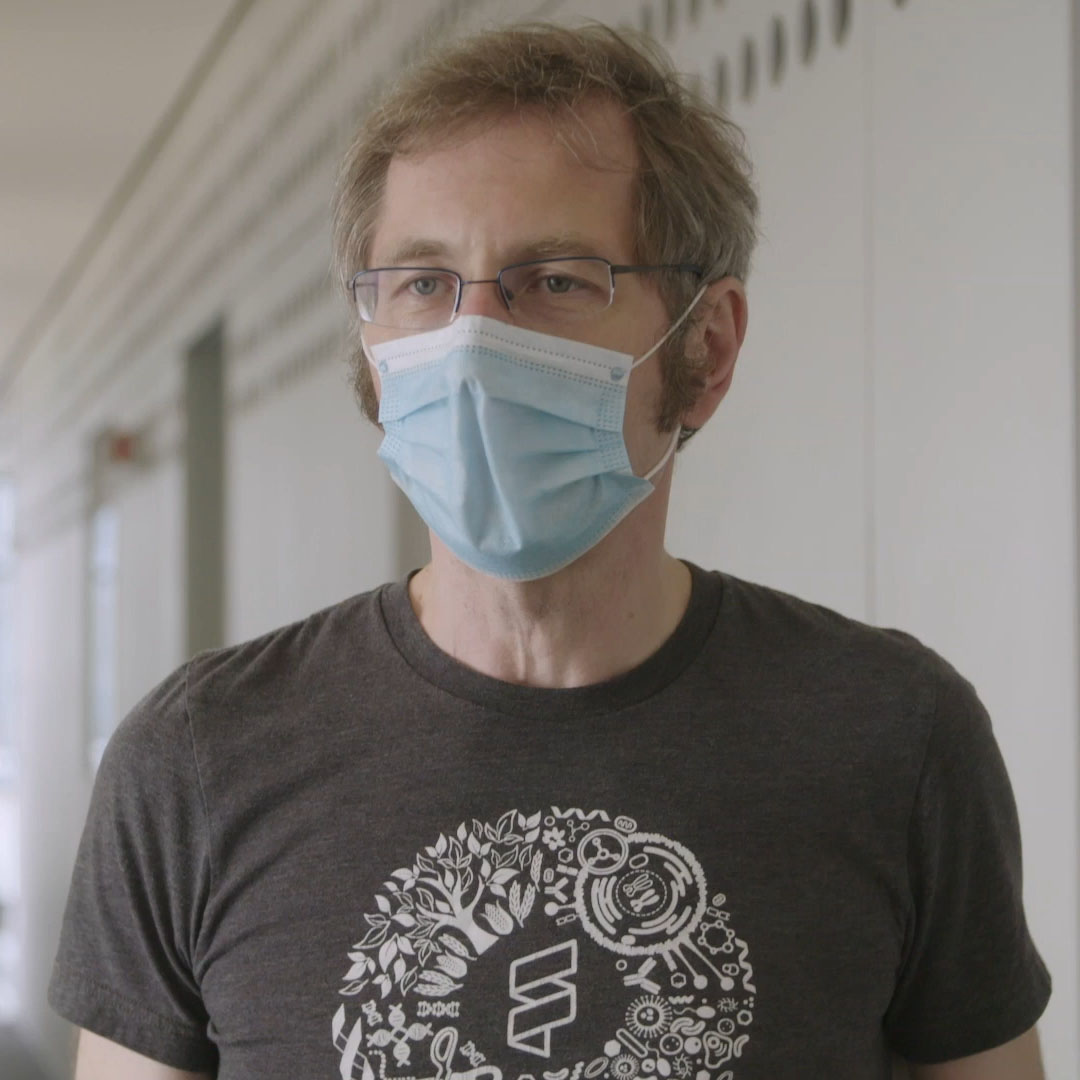
Urnov in a 2020 interview

In 2019 Urnov joined UC Berkeley as Professor of Genetics, Genomics, and Development and Director of the Center for Translational Genomics at the Innovative Genomics Institute.

In 2025 Urnov helped to lead a team that created a customized CRISPR treatment six months after birth for an infant born with a deadly genetic disease, CPS1 deficiency.

He is a cofounder of Tune Therapeutics, an epigenome editing company that is beginning a clinical trial in Hong Kong to treat chronic hepatitis B. Tune raised a $40M Series A and $175M Series B to fund its efforts in therapeutic development.

== Cathy Tie conflict ==
In October 2026, Urnov attracted controversy for making disparaging comments about Origin Genomics founder Cathy Tie in a series of posts on X. Urnov called Tie a "vile charlatan" and likened her to disgraced Theranos founder Elizabeth Holmes. He wrote that Tie needed to "get a PhD" before they could "talk as peers". That assertion drew a rebuke from Eric Betzig, who urged Urnov to "take the L". Urnov was also criticized by Jura Bio founder Elizabeth Wood, who recounted a meeting in which Urnov was agitated and condescending, shouting at Wood and her colleagues. Replying on X, Urnov apologized to Wood for his behavior and said he would "strive to do better".

== Honors and awards ==
- 2024 Horace Mann Medal, Brown University
