= Jonathan Weissman =

American scientist and academic

Jonathan S. Weissman
- Education: Harvard University, MIT, Yale University
- Known for: Ribosome profiling Protein folding
- Awards: Protein Society Irving Sigal Young Investigator Award (2004); Raymond and Beverly Sackler International Prize (2008); National Academy of Sciences Award for Scientific Discovery (2015)
- Scientific career
- Fields: Biochemistry Biophysics
- Workplaces: MIT UCSF HHMI
- Doctoral advisor: Peter Kim
- Other academic advisors: Arthur Horwich

Jonathan S. Weissman is an American biophysicist and molecular biologist who is the Landon T. Clay Professor of Biology at the Massachusetts Institute of Technology, a member of the Whitehead Institute, and a Howard Hughes Medical Institute Investigator. From 1996 to 2020, he was a faculty member in the department of cellular molecular pharmacology at the University of California, San Francisco.

== Education ==
He earned his B.A. in physics from Harvard College (1988) and his Ph.D. in physics (1993) from MIT working with Peter Kim. There, he started his studies on protein folding examining Bovine pancreatic trypsin inhibitor (BPTI).

He was a postdoctoral fellow at Yale University (1993–1996), where he worked with Arthur Horwich studying the mechanism of GroEL.

== Career ==
Weissman's research team studies how cells ensure that proteins fold into their correct shape, as well as the role of protein misfolding in disease and normal physiology. The team also develops experimental and analytical approaches for exploring the organizational principles of biological systems and globally monitoring protein translation through ribosome profiling. A broad goal of his work is to bridge large-scale approaches and in depth mechanistic investigations to reveal the information encoded within genomes.

Weissman has been a member of the National Academy of Sciences since 2009. in 2015, he co-founded the Innovative Genomics Institute with Jennifer Doudna.

Weissman joined the Whitehead Institute and MIT in March 2020.
