= KJ Muldoon =

American gene therapy recipient (born 2024)

- Born: Kyle Muldoon Jr. August 1, 2024 (age 23 months); Philadelphia, Pennsylvania, U.S.
- Known for: Recipient of the first personalized CRISPR gene editing

Kyle Muldoon Jr. (medical identification KJ, born 1 August 2024) is the first person to have received personalized gene therapy using CRISPR gene editing.

Born with an extremely rare (one in a million) genetic condition with metabolic disorder, called the neonatal-onset carbamoyl phosphate synthetase I (CPS1) deficiency, he was given a genome tailored gene for CPS1 in 2025 that helped him to acquire normal urea cycle and normal ammonia metabolism.

The gene-editing technique for his condition was developed by David Liu's lab in 2016-2017, and designed by Rebecca C. Ahrens-Nicklas and Kiran Musunuru in 2024 for KJ's mutation, and treatment was completed in April 2025, which was reported in The New England Journal of Medicine. He is listed in the Nature's 10 of 2025 as the "Trailblazing baby" as the first person saved by personalized CRISPR gene editing.

== Biography ==
Muldoon is the fourth child of Kyle and Nicole Muldoon. He has one brother and two sisters. Just a day after he was born at the Children's Hospital of Philadelphia, the doctors noticed him having unusual sleepiness and aversion to food. He was admitted to the neonatal intensive care unit. Medical investigation showed he had accumulated ammonia in his blood. He was admitted "indefinitely" for the urea cycle disorder management. He was diagnosed with a mutation that caused carbamoyl phosphate synthetase I (CPS1) deficiency, which is an extremely rare genetic condition estimated to be one in a million, and the worst of urea cycle disorders.

=== Medical condition ===
Both Muldoon's parents were carriers (autosomal recessive inheritance) of the CPS1 mutation so that Muldoon received the mutations in his two chromosome 2. CPS1 deficiency is the deadliest condition among urea cycle disorders accounting for 50% deaths among the genetically abnormal individuals. CPS1 in a critical enzyme in urea cycle that adds the ammonia to bicarbonate along with a phosphate group to form carbamoyl phosphate. Carbamoyl phosphate is the key intermediate compound that kicks start the urea cycle (a physiological pathway in protein metabolism) which convert ammonia to urea for excretion. In a rare mutation causing the absence of CPS1, ammonia is never utilized and accumulates in the blood (hyperammonemia). High levels of ammonia become toxic to tissues, especially the brain, and ultimately lead to brain damage and death. Even survivors have long-term neurological problems.

He was too young for a liver transplant which was the only major treatment available at the time. For such transplant he had to wait at least one year of age, by which time Muldoon would have a high chance of developing the long-term symptoms of CPS1 deficiency. Since 2023, Rebecca C. Ahrens-Nicklas (one of the main physicians of Muldoon) and her friend Kiran Musunuru, medical researcher at the Perelman School of Medicine at the University of Pennsylvania, had been experimenting on CRISPR gene editing on metabolic disorder (specifically phenylketonurea) using mice. They analysed Muldoon's genetic condition and discussed with the baby's parents of the risks and possibilities of gene editing that had never been performed in humans. Ahrens-Nicklas remarked: "In KJ we sort of chose the hardest situation we could have... We had to essentially do time trials to speed up development of an editing solution [a suitable base editor and guide RNA], because providing a therapy after a year and a half is not going to help a kid with a urea cycle disorder."

=== Treatment and outcome ===
With the family consent, Ahrens-Nicklas and Musunuru hurriedly performed the whole genome sequencing of Muldoon because each passing day meant growing risk of brain damage. They discovered that Muldoon had CPS1 truncations, mutations identified as Q335X inherited from the father and E714X inherited from the mother. They understood that their experimental CRISPR gene therapy could work on Muldoon. They applied to the US Food and Drug Administration for permission to use CRISPR gene editing as a special investigational new drug (specifically a single-patient expanded-access IND). A single-patient expanded-access IND is described by Jonathan D. Grinstein as "a compassionate-use pathway designed for critically ill patients with no alternatives." As Ahrens-Nicklas explained: "It's not formal research—it’s designed to help a patient." The FDA issued the approval in one week.

For successful gene editing, Ahrens-Nicklas and Musunuru sought the help of scientists at the Innovative Genomics Institute of the University of California, Berkeley, Broad Institute of MIT and Harvard, Massachusetts General Hospital, Integrated DNA Technologies, Acuitas Therapeutics, The Jackson Laboratory, and Danaher Corporation. They used modified adenine base editor to make messenger RNA encapsulated in lipid nanoparticles that could be injected into the individual. They named the therapy "kayjayguran abengcemeran" (or "k-abe" after Muldoon). Sandy Ottensmann, vice-president at Integrated DNA Technologies reported, saying, "We estimated that it would take 18 months [to make k-abe], we did it in six." Muldoon received his first treatment on 25 February 2025 at six-months old. After a seven-week infusion (in three doses, the limit permitted by FDA) with the therapy, Muldoon had stable ammonia level and tolerated protein diet. He was released from the hospital on 2 June 2025. Their report on the research method was published in the journal Cell in December 2025.

Muldoon is not yet cured, but much of the dangers of his genetic disease had been eliminated and he can eat a normal protein diet without any effects. It is possible that he still may need a liver transplant, but the therapy would help him delay the need that itself will be a benefit. As Ahrens-Nicklas reported: "I would love it if he never needed a liver transplant. But even if we can protect him enough to delay that until he is bigger, that would be a huge win for him because we know outcomes of liver transplants are so much better in children who are outside of infancy."
