= Jack Greenblatt =

Canadian scientist

- Education: McGill University, Harvard University
- Known for: Discovery of protein factors initiation of transcription
- Scientific career
- Fields: Molecular genetics, Functional genomics
- Workplaces: The University of Toronto
- Doctoral students: Nevan Krogan

Jack Greenblatt is the Ann and Max Tannenbaum Professor of Molecular Genetics at the University of Toronto, a Fellow of the Royal Society of Canada, and a Fellow of the American Academy of Microbiology. He has been a recipient of a Medical Research Council of Canada Distinguished Scientist Award, and an International Research Scholar of the Howard Hughes Medical Institute. He is the recipient of the 2011 Tony Pawson Proteomics Award from the Canadian National Proteomics Network.

He earned a BSc (First Class Honours in Physics) from McGill University in 1967. Greenblatt received his Ph.D. in biophysics from Harvard University in 1973, studying under Walter Gilbert, and his postdoctoral training at the University of Geneva and the Pasteur Institute.

Greenblatt's group has discovered important protein factors required for initiation of transcription in eukaryotic cells.
