= Edward Rebar =

- Born: Edward John Rebar
- Education: Rutgers University (B.S.); Massachusetts Institute of Technology (Ph.D.)
- Known for: Zinc finger protein platform
- Scientific career
- Fields: Structural biology; Biophysics
- Workplaces: Sana Biotechnology, Sangamo Therapeutics
- Thesis: Selection studies of zinc finger-DNA recognition (1997)
- Doctoral advisor: Carl Pabo

Edward John Rebar is an American biologist, and is senior vice president and chief technology officer of Sana Biotechnology.

== Education ==
Edward John Rebar earned a Bachelor of Science in biochemistry from Rutgers University. He completed a Doctor of Philosophy in biophysics and structural biology from Massachusetts Institute of Technology. His 1997 dissertation was titled Selection studies of zinc finger-DNA recognition. His doctoral advisor was Carl Pabo. Rebar worked as a post-doctoral fellow at the University of California, Berkeley.

== Career ==
Rebar joined Sangamo Therapeutics in 1998. He worked on the zinc finger protein platform developed by the company. In 2018, Rebar replaced Michael C. Holmes as the senior vice president and chief technology officer of Sangamo. In 2020, Rebar became the chief technology officer of Sana Biotechnology.
