= Quantitative Biosciences Institute =

Research group in the University of California

The Quantitative Biosciences Institute (QBI) was established in 2016 as an organized research unit (ORU) within the School of Pharmacy at the University of California-San Francisco. The current director of QBI is Nevan Krogan.

== History ==
In 1993, Irwin Kuntz, created an ORU within the School of Pharmacy, called the Molecular Design Institute (MDI). The Dean of the School of Pharmacy, B. Joseph Guglielmo with the support of the UCSF campus and the UC Office of the President transformed MDI into QBI.

Previously, QBI was a part of QB3, also known as QB3-UCSF. In March 2016, UCSF established QBI as an Organized Research Unit (ORU) within the School of Pharmacy.

== QBI Coronavirus Research Group ==
The institute formed the QBI Coronavirus Research Group (QCRG), a collaborative group of labs, aimed at finding solutions for COVID-19.
