= Alex Marson =

American biologist

- Born: June 5, 1979 (age 47); Manhattan, NY USA
- Education: Harvard University (BA, MD); Cambridge University (MPhil); Massachusetts Institute of Technology (PhD)
- Occupation: Biologist

Alexander Marson (born June 5, 1979) is an American biologist and infectious disease doctor who specializes in genetics, human immunology, and genome engineering. He is the director of the Gladstone-UCSF Institute of Genomic Immunology, and a tenured professor with a dual appointment in the Department of Medicine and the Department of Microbiology & Immunology at the University of California, San Francisco (UCSF).

Marson is best known for his work with Clustered Regularly Interspaced Short Palindromic Repeats (CRISPR), particularly for his advances in furthering understanding of the genomics of human T cell function. Marson also holds affiliations with the Parker Institute for Cancer Immunotherapy (PICI), the Chan Zuckerberg Biohub, and the Innovative Genomics Institute (IGI).

== Biography ==
Alex Marson was born June 5, 1979, in Manhattan, New York. He is the son of Ellen Marson, a professor of Spanish literature and former director of Hadassah, and Bernard Marson, an architect. Marson graduated summa cum laude with an A.B. in biology from Harvard University in 2001. He then pursued a master's degree in Biological Sciences from the University of Cambridge in 2003. Later, he received a Ph.D. in Biology from Massachusetts Institute of Technology in 2008.

Marson's research focuses on reprogramming human immune cells, especially T cells, with CRISPR. The applications of this research are in the treatment of cancer, autoimmune diseases, HIV and a wide range of other diseases. In August 2018, Marson was selected as Wired Magazine's 25 Icons of the next 25 Years for his research in DNA programming and genome editing for cancer immunotherapy.

In April & May 2020, Marson and colleagues at UCSF, the Gladstone Institutes, & UC Berkeley collaborated on the meta-testing of COVID-19 antibody tests to verify the accuracy of results. Marson appeared on CNN, PBS, NBC, and NPR.

Marson is the scientific director for biomedicine at the Innovative Genomics Institute (IGI). He is a member of the Parker Institute for Cancer Immunotherapy and was selected as one of the inaugural Chan Zuckerberg Biohub investigators.

== Awards and recognition ==
- 2016 - American Society for Clinical Investigation (ASCI) Young Physician-Scientist Award
- 2016 - Burroughs Wellcome Foundation Career Award for Medical Scientists
- 2016 - NIDA/NIH Avenir New Innovator Award
- 2016 - Parker Institute for Cancer Immunotherapy, Project Member
- 2017 - Chan Zuckerberg Biohub Investigator
- 2018 - Parker Institute for Cancer Immunotherapy, Member
