= Susan Gerbi =

American biologist

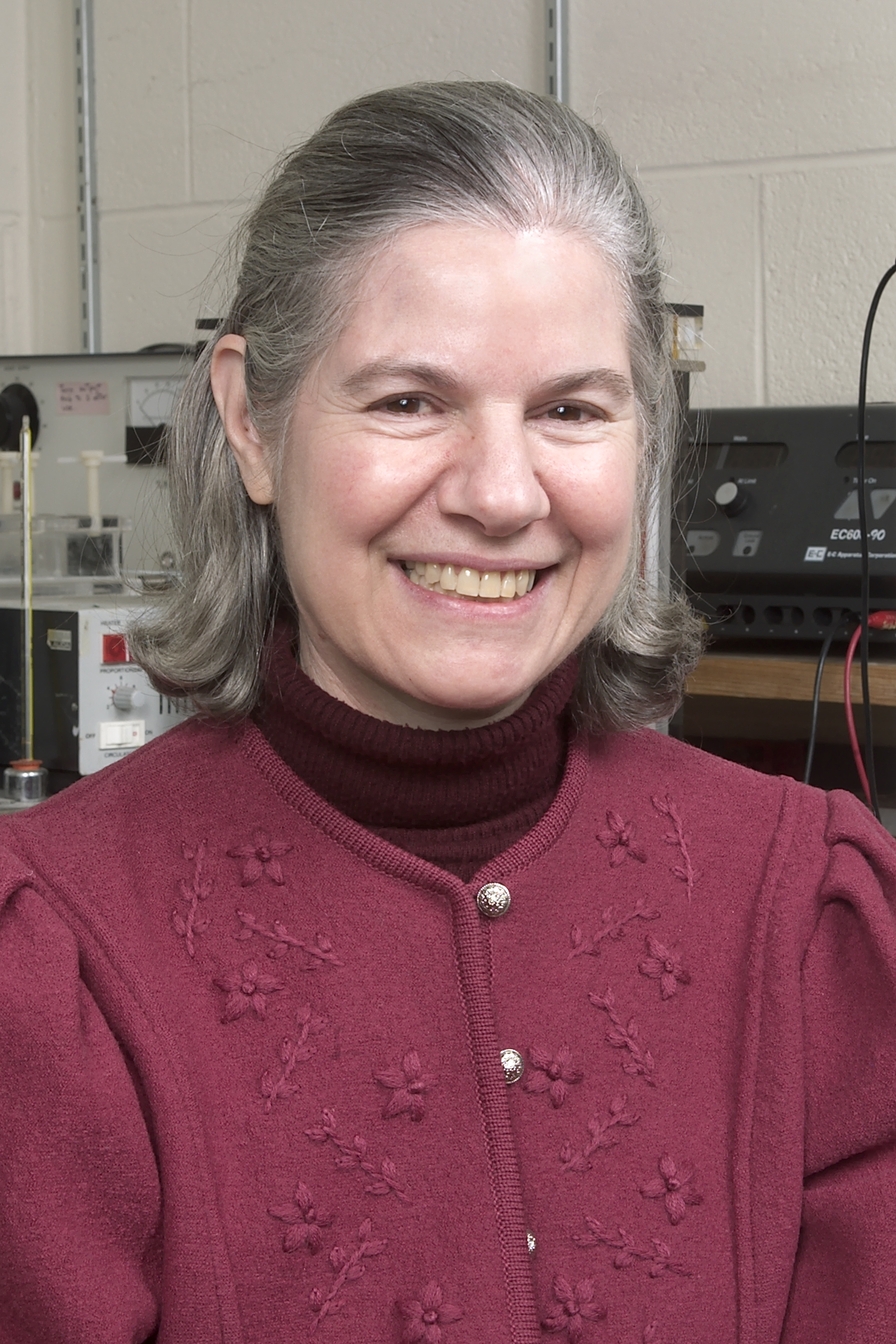
- Alpert Medical School faculty photo, 2003
- Born: 1944 (age 80–81)
- Education: Barnard College (B.A., 1965); Yale University (M.A., 1968) (PhD, 1970)
- Awards: State of Rhode Island Governor's Award for Scientific Achievement (1993); George W. Beadle Award (2017)
- Scientific career
- Fields: Biology; Biochemistry
- Institutions: Max Planck Institute; Brown University
- Thesis: (1970)
- Notable students: Fyodor Urnov; Lynn J. Rothschild

Susan Gerbi (born 1944) is the George Eggleston Professor of Biochemistry and a professor of biology at Brown University.

== Early life and education ==
Susan Gerbi received her B.A. degree in zoology from Barnard College in 1965. She was a postdoctoral fellow at the Max-Planck-Institut für Biologie in Tübingen, Germany.

== Research career ==
Gerbi received her PhD from Yale University in 1970 for her work with Joseph Gall; she and Gall developed the technique of in situ hybridization, which is used to localize RNA or DNA in tissue. After earning her doctorate, she completed a fellowship at the Max Planck Institute before returning to the United States and establishing her own laboratory at Brown University. Between 1998 and 2001, she published research detailing a method to determine the nucleotide where DNA replication begins for a gene and showed that in yeast and other eukaryotes, this site is adjacent to the origin recognition complex binding site. Her recent research has covered conservation of ribosomal RNA sequences between prokaryotes and eukaryotes, as well as the role of small nucleolar RNA (a subset of small nuclear RNA) during ribosomal RNA post-translational modification. Her work uses Drosophila melanogaster and Bradysia (Sciara) coprophila, which is particularly well-suited to studies of chromosome mechanics.

== Awards and honors ==
Gerbi was the President of the American Society for Cell Biology in 1993. In 1991, she chaired the Society's Women in Cell Biology Committee, which was made an official standing committee of the ASCB in 1992, an effort that Gerbi spearheaded. Gerbi also received the State of Rhode Island Governor's award for Scientific Excellence. She is a fellow of the American Association for the Advancement of Science, elected in 2008. In 2013, she was honored by the National Women's History Project as one of 18 women honored in Women's History Month. Gerbi is a founding board member of the Rosalind Franklin Society, which was formed in 2007.
