= Bradley Ringeisen =

American chemist and scientific administrator

Bradley Richard Ringeisen
- Born: April, 1974; New York City
- Other name: Brad Ringeisen
- Education: Wake Forest University (B.S.); University of Wisconsin-Madison (Ph.D.)
- Scientific career
- Fields: Physical Chemistry, Bioprinting, Microbiology, Genome Editing
- Workplaces: U.S. Naval Research Laboratory; DARPA; Innovative Genomics Institute, University of California, Berkeley

Bradley Richard Ringeisen (born April,1973) is an American physical chemist and an early contributor to the field of live cell printing. He is currently the executive director of the Innovative Genomics Institute at the University of California, Berkeley, a research institute founded by Nobel laureate Jennifer Doudna to develop CRISPR genome editing solutions to problems in health, climate, and agriculture.

== Early life and education ==
Ringeisen was born in New York City, and his family moved to Clemson, South Carolina when he was 6 years old. His father was Richard Delose Ringeisen, a professor in the Math department at Clemson University from 1979–1993, and from 2001–2011 served as the Chancellor of the University of Illinois Springfield.

Ringeisen earned a B.S. in Chemistry from Wake Forest University and a Ph.D. in Chemistry in 2000 from the University of Wisconsin–Madison in the laboratory of chemist Gilbert Nathanson. Ringeisen’s graduate research explored surface dynamics and gas-liquid interfaces using molecular beams and quadrupole mass spectrometers to measure scattering, reactions, and interfacial residence times. This background studying how molecules interact at physical boundaries served as a foundation for later cross-disciplinary work developing biological printing technologies for living cells and microbial fuel cells as well as studying mechanisms of microbial extracellular electron transfer.

== Career and research ==
=== Live cell printing ===
After completing his Ph.D., Ringeisen accepted a postdoctoral associateship at the U.S. Naval Research Laboratory (NRL). Though his background was in chemistry, the NRL assigned him projects with significant biological components. Ringeisen spent his early years at NRL learning how to culture bacteria and mammalian cells.

In the early 2000s, Ringeisen and colleagues began experimenting with using focused laser pulses to shoot ultra-thin films of biological materials onto substrates for biosensors. Ringeisen and colleagues showed that live E. coli bacteria could be laser printed by freezing a bacterial culture to make it solid enough to print. The ice crystals protected the bacteria from the photomechanical effects of the laser and the cells survived and multiplied following printing. In 2002, Ringeisen transitioned to a new role as Head of the Bioenergy and Biofabrication Section at NRL, and his research shifted from bacteria to mammalian cells and tissue engineering. Ringeisen’s work demonstrated the ability to print mammalian cells in both two and three dimensions, setting the stage for later experiments across the field of bioprinting including organ-scale printing. Ringeisen’s bioprinting experience led him to establish the US Department of Defense 3D Bioprinting Consortium in 2015 and serve as the Chief Technology Officer for the Defense Department's Advanced Technology Biofabrication Manufacturing Innovation Institute.

=== DARPA ===
In 2016, Ringeisen shifted into executive oversight of large research organizations, moving to the Defense Advanced Research Projects Agency (DARPA) as Deputy Director (2016–2019) and then Director (2019–2020) of the Biological Technologies Office. In these roles, Ringeisen oversaw multiple programs that started his work with genomics and CRISPR gene editing, including the Safe Genes program, a research initiative launched by Renee Wegrzyn in 2016 to develop the public health benefits of tools like CRISPR-Cas9 while simultaneously building defense capabilities to prevent and reverse misuse of genomic technologies.

=== Innovative Genomics Institute ===
Brad Ringeisen in conversation with Jennifer Doudna at the Inside IGI symposium at UC Berkeley in 2024 discussing the future of climate and agricultural applications of CRISPR gene editing.

In 2020, Ringeisen left DARPA to take on the role of Executive Director of the Innovative Genomics Institute (IGI), a research institute based at the University of California, Berkeley founded by Jennifer Doudna, co-inventor of CRISPR gene editing.

Under Ringeisen, the IGI expanded its research into sustainable agriculture and climate change, applying CRISPR and other genomic technologies to problems including methane emissions from livestock and rice cultivation. Ringeisen has written perspectives and spoken publicly about the need to address food security in the face of climate change, and the potential of genomic technologies to play a helpful role.

Ringeisen built on the IGI’s research into rare disease therapies, supporting the development of personalized CRISPR therapies as well as efforts to broaden access to gene-editing therapies. He leads projects studying the mechanisms of neurodegenerative diseases as well as the development of new gene-editing proteins for in vivo delivery to organs beyond the liver and blood, with a focus on the brain.
