= Kiran Musunuru =

American cardiologist

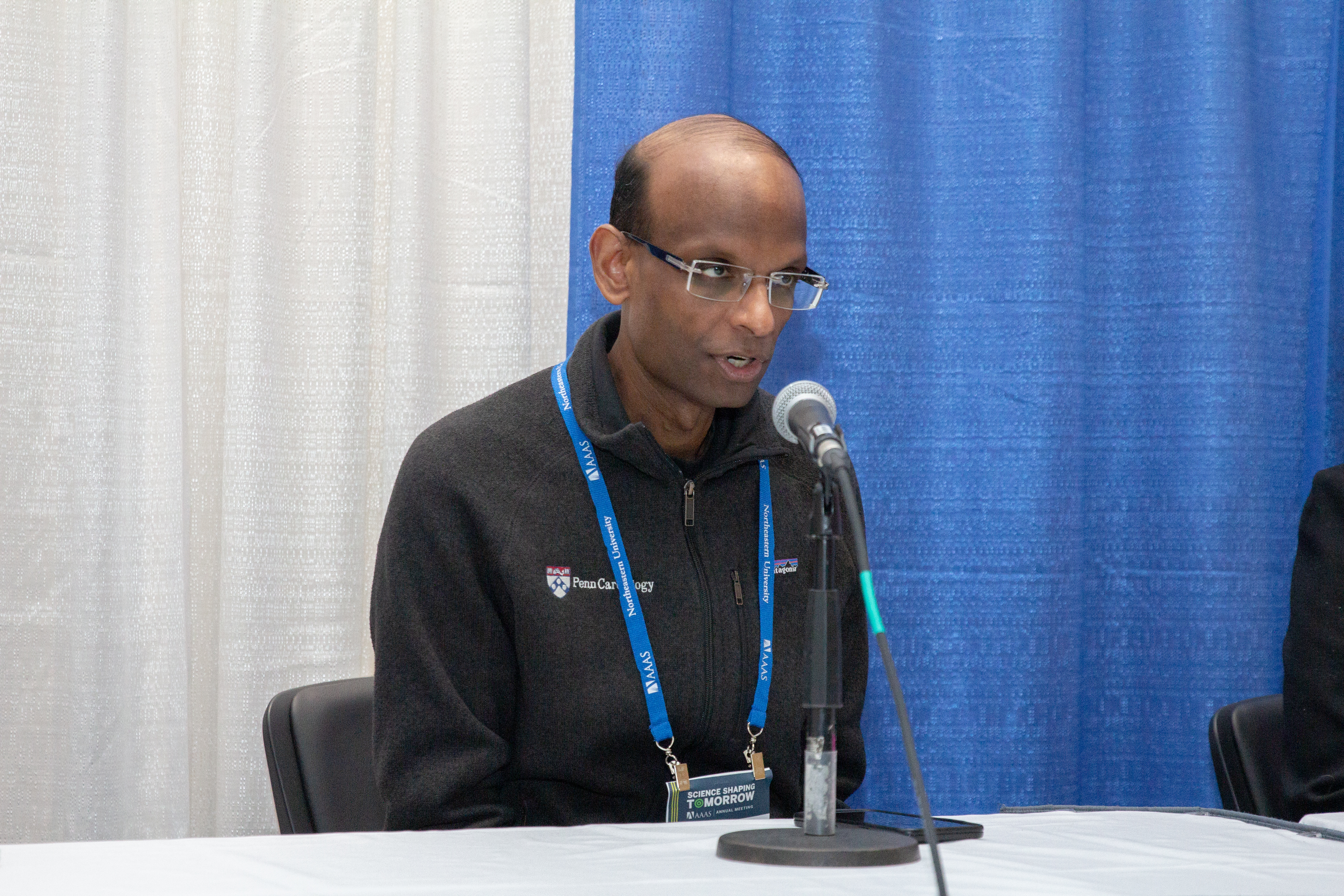
- Born: New York City
- Education: Harvard College (BSc, 1997), Rockefeller University (PhD, 2003), Weill Cornell Medicine (MD, 2004), Johns Hopkins Bloomberg School of Public Health (MPH, 2009), University of Pennsylvania Law School (ML, 2019)
- Awards: Presidential Early Career Award for Scientists and Engineers
- Scientific career
- Fields: Cardiology, CRISPR gene editing
- Workplaces: Perelman School of Medicine at the University of Pennsylvania, Brigham and Women's Hospital, Johns Hopkins Hospital, Massachusetts General Hospital, Broad Institute
- Website: https://www.kiranmusunuru.com/

Kiran Musunuru is an American cardiologist who is a Professor of Medicine at the University of Pennsylvania Perelman School of Medicine. He researches the genetics and genomics of cardiovascular and metabolic diseases. Musunuru is a leading expert in the field of gene-editing.

== Early life and education ==
Musunuru is the son of Rao and Prameela Musunuru; he was born in New York City and grew up in Florida. His father is a renowned cardiologist who moved to the US from India in 1976. He is of Telugu descent hailing from Uppaluru village, Krishna Dt, Andhra Pradesh.

Musunuru obtained a degree in Biochemical Sciences from Harvard College in 1997. He later obtained a PhD in Biomedical Sciences from Rockefeller University in 2003, and an MD from Weill-Cornell Medical College in 2004. Musunuru also graduated with a Masters of Public Health (MPH) in Epidemiology from the Johns Hopkins Bloomberg School of Public Health in 2009, and an ML in Law from the University of Pennsylvania Law School in 2019.

Musunuru was interested in heart disease early in his medical career, first training in Internal Medicine at Brigham and Women's Hospital and then in Cardiovascular Medicine at Johns Hopkins Hospital. He also undertook postdoctoral work at the Massachusetts General Hospital, as well as the Broad Institute.

== Research and career ==
Musunuru's researches the genetics and genomics of cardiovascular and metabolic diseases, and is a leading expert in genome-editing techniques, particularly CRISPR-Cas9. His lab was the first to develop an efficient technique to genetically modify human pluripotent stem cells, and differentiate them to model disease. He discovered two novel genes involved in coronary artery disease: SORT1 and ANGPTL3. His research aims to find genetic variants which affect the course of disease and could be used to develop protective therapies. Musunuru ultimately hopes to create a one-shot "vaccination" against heart attacks, which would introduce a complementary, loss-of-function mutation in a gene such as ANGPTL3 to lower the risk of developing cardiovascular disease in at-risk populations.

Musunuru has pioneered the use of genome-editing tools as therapies for heart disease. For example, some people with a variant of the PCSK9 gene have lower levels of low-density lipoprotein (LDL) cholesterol levels, and therefore have a reduced risk of heart attack. Research from Musunuru's laboratory has shown that the levels of the PCSK9 gene expression could be altered in the liver of mice using CRISPR-Cas9 gene editing technology, drastically reducing the mice's cholesterol levels. Musunuru has also led research into prenatal gene editing of PCSK9 or HPD using both CRISPR-Cas9 and base editor 3 (BE3), offering a proof-of-concept for a potential new therapeutic approach for congenital genetic disorders. Musunuru cofounded Verve Therapeutics to develop gene editing techniques for treat cholesterol altering congenital genetic disorders.

In 2019, Musunuru was among a team of researchers at the University of Pennsylvania to develop a stem cell-based test for the effect of genetic variants on heart muscle cells. They used the test to determine that a 65-year-old woman's specific variant of TNNT2, a gene which has been associated with cardiomyopathy, was not pathogenic.

He was an Associate Professor of Cardiovascular Medicine and Genetics at the Perelman School of Medicine at the University of Pennsylvania, as well as the scientific director of the Center for Inherited Cardiovascular Disease. He is now a Professor of Medicine at the University of Pennsylvania Perelman School of Medicine. As of 2021, he serves on the board of directors of the American Society of Human Genetics, in addition to serving on its Diversity and Inclusion Task force.

Musunuru is the author of The CRISPR Generation: The Story of the World's First Gene-Edited Babies, in which he delves into the scientific breakthroughs that enabled He Jiankui to create the world's first gene-edited babies, a scandal Musunuru describes as a "historic ethical fiasco, a deeply flawed experiment". He was one of the independent experts who reviewed He's manuscript.

Musunuru was the primary author of an NEJM paper in which KJ Muldoon, a baby born with a liver disorder, Carbamoyl phosphate synthetase I deficiency, received CRISPR gene editing technology. The disorder is caused by a mutation in the CPS1 gene.

== Awards and honours ==
- The Presidential Early Career Award for Scientists and Engineers (2013)
- Harvard University's Fannie Cox Prize for Excellence in Science Teaching (2014)
- The American Heart Association's Award for Meritorious Achievement (2016)
- The Gill Heart and Vascular Institute Translational Award for Early Stage Career Investigators (2017)
- Elected to the American Society for Clinical Investigation (2017)
- The American Philosophical Society's Judson Daland Prize for Outstanding Achievement in Clinical Investigation "in recognition of his work discovering and therapeutically targeting cardiovascular disease genes" (2018)
- The American Federation for Medical Research's Outstanding Investigator Award (2019)

== See also ==
- Musunuru, his ancestral village in Andhra Pradesh, India
