= Mary Dasso =

American biochemist

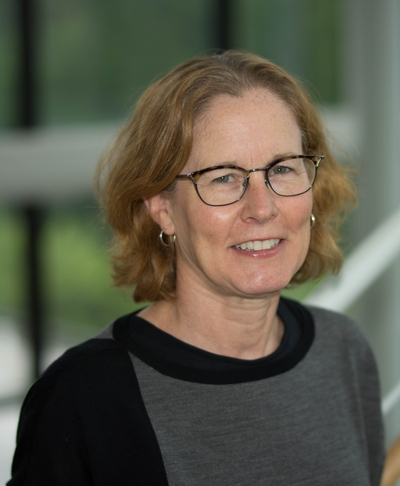
- Born: United States
- Education: University of Oregon (BA); University of Cambridge (PhD)
- Known for: Ran GTPase
- Scientific career
- Fields: Biochemistry
- Workplaces: Eunice Kennedy Shriver National Institute of Child Health and Human Development
- Academic advisors: Pete H. von Hippel

Mary C. Dasso is an American biochemist known for research on chromosome segregation and the discovery of Ran GTPase. She is the acting scientific director of the division of intramural research and a senior investigator in the section on cell cycle regulation at the Eunice Kennedy Shriver National Institute of Child Health and Human Development.

== Early life and education ==
Dasso was raised in Eugene, Oregon, along with her three siblings. Her father was a professor at the Charles H. Lundquist College of Business, and her mother was a homemaker. Her family spent a lot of time outdoors and on camping trips which later influenced her interest in biology starting in high school. At her parents' suggestion, she attended University of Oregon with intentions on following in her brother's footsteps to apply to law school. Her sophomore year, Dasso held a summer position in Pete H. von Hippel's laboratory where she studied the function of T4 DNA polymerase, which is now commonly used by researchers to mutate genes of interest and conduct DNA-related studies. She continued in his lab through the rest of her time in Oregon, and those studies became the basis of her thesis at the Robert D. Clark Honors College. In 1984, Dasso graduated summa cum laude with a major in chemistry and a minor in mathematics.

She was a Marshall Scholar at the University of Cambridge, where she obtained her Ph.D. in biochemistry. At Cambridge, she chose to work with in the laboratories of Richard Jackson and Tim Hunt. She studied the initiation of eukaryotic mRNA translation, examining how the cells of complex organisms, such as plants and animals, turned DNA instructions into new proteins. Her scholarship was initially set for 2 years, but Dasso successfully applied for an additional third year so that she could earn her doctoral degree.

=== Postdoctoral research ===
Starting that the end of 1988, Dasso became a Damon Runyon Fellow in John W. Newport's laboratory at the University of California, San Diego, where she began to study cell cycle regulation. Dasso published her first major postdoctoral paper in 1990; it came together quickly because new systems to study cell cycle in vitro, using frog egg extracts, had recently been developed. Her project identified checkpoints that ensured DNA replication finished before mitosis began.

Dasso then expanded her work, looking for proteins involved in the replication checkpoint, which led her to a collaboration with the lab of Takeharu Nishimoto at Kyushu University. Years earlier, Nishimoto had shown that cells without the RCC1 protein attempted to divide before completing DNA replication, resulting in catastrophic damage to chromosomes; he also identified the gene, RCC1, that made the protein. Nishimoto first sent a postdoctoral researcher, Hideo Nishitani, to conduct RCC1 experiments in Newport's lab at UCSD. Then, Dasso went to Japan to complete more experiments. She learned about mammalian genetics in Nishimoto's lab and about how cultural factors could advance or hinder the careers of male and female scientists.

== Career ==
In 1992, Dasso brought her UCSD cell cycle projects to the National Institutes of Health as a staff scientist in Alan Wolffe's laboratory of molecular embryology at the Eunice Kennedy Shriver National Institute of Child Health and Human Development (NICHD). She studied how RCC1 interacted with chromatin. In 1994, she became a tenure-track investigator in 1994 and received tenure in 2000. She is a senior investigator in the section on cell cycle regulation. In 2015, she became the associate scientific director for budget and administration. Dasso became acting scientific director of the division of intramural research in February 2020.

=== Research ===
Dasso is interested in mechanisms of chromosome segregation. Her group discovered that the Ran GTPase. They showed that Ran carries out mitotic functions in a manner that is completely independent of nuclear transport. They further demonstrated that other components of the nuclear transport machinery are similarly re-purposed as cells divide to perform transport-independent activities that are essential for accurate chromosome segregation. In particular, nuclear pore complex proteins, called nucleoporins, localize to mitotic spindles and kinetochores; this localization is essential for proper spindle assembly and cell cycle progression.

Dasso's group has developed CRISPR-based strategies for selective degradation of individual nucleoporins. They are now using these systems to examine not only the role of nucleoporins in mitotic chromosome segregation but also how nucleoporins contribute to NPC structure and assembly, to gene regulation, to RNA processing and export as well as to the trafficking of key nuclear components.

Dasso published key findings on the small ubiquitin-related modifier (SUMO) pathway that then contributed to the discovery of SUMOylation, a process in which proteins are tagged by SUMO proteins, thereby modifying the tagged protein's function. In 2010, her team showed that the SUMO protein SENP6 was essential for assembling the kinetochore, another key structure that forms during mitosis.

== Awards and honors ==
Dasso was elected to the American Association for the Advancement of Science in 2018 and the American Society for Cell Biology in 2019.
