= Rebar (disambiguation) =

Rebar is a steel bar or mesh of steel wires used as a tension device in reinforced concrete and reinforced masonry.

Rebar may also refer to:

- Rebar (Taiwan), a company in Taiwan
- Rebar art and design studio, an art studio in San Francisco, United States
- ReBAR, an abbreviation for resizable BAR, which is a feature in the PCI configuration space

== People with the surname ==
- Alex Rebar, American actor and filmmaker
- Edward Rebar, American biologist
- Kelly Rebar (born 1956), Canadian playwright and screenwriter
