= Carl Pabo =

Carl Ogren Pabo is a biophysicist. He is the founder and president of Humanity 2050, a nonprofit institute.

== Education ==
- B.S. (summa cum laude) from Yale, Molecular Biophysics and Biochemistry in 1974
- Ph.D. from Harvard, Biochemistry and Molecular Biology in 1980.

== Career ==
Pabo has been a professor at the Johns Hopkins University School of Medicine (1982–1991) and at the Massachusetts Institute of Technology (1991–2001) and an investigator with the Howard Hughes Medical Institute (1986–2001). He's been a visiting professor at Caltech, Stanford, Berkeley and Harvard. At Caltech, he taught a course called “The World in 2050.”

In 1991, he used X-ray crystallography to show how Zinc finger nucleases attach to DNA. In 1994, after moving to the MIT, he showed how zinc fingers could be custom built to grab onto any desired three-base pair DNA sequence. This was an important step toward building the full library of zinc fingers for all 64 sequences. He was chief scientific officer at Sangamo BioSciences from 2001 to 2003.

In 2018, he founded Humanity 2050 to “to advocate a more comprehensive, coherent way of thinking about the human future.” He also serves as a scientific advisor for NanoDimension.

== Awards and honors ==
Pabo became a Guggenheim Fellow in 2005. He is a member of the National Academy of Sciences and of the American Academy of Arts and Sciences. Was awarded the Pfizer Award in Enzyme Chemistry in 1992. He has also won the Protein Society Young Investigator Award and the Pfizer Award in enzymology.
