= Nevan Krogan =

Canadian molecular and systems biologist

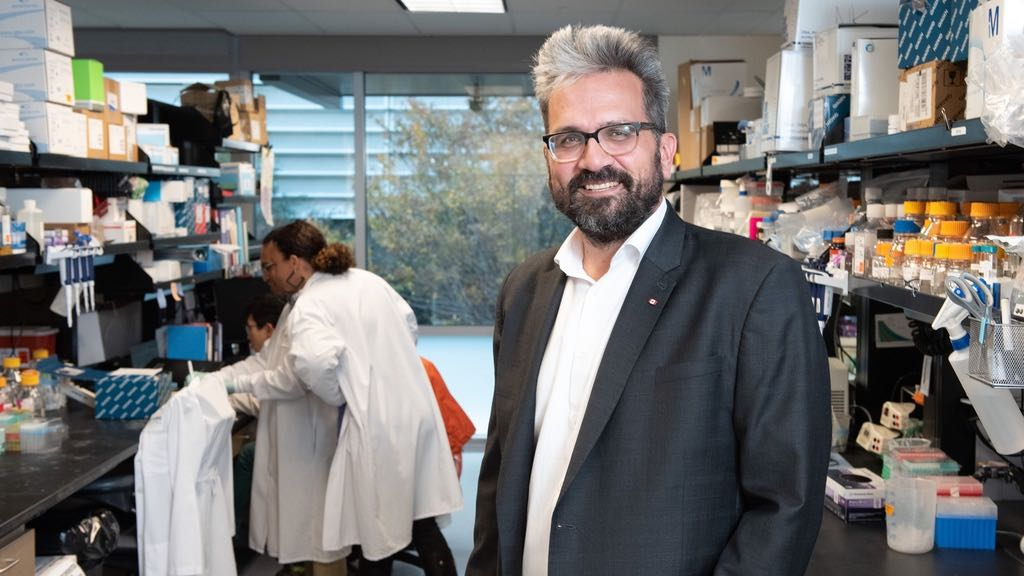

Academic background
- Education: University of Regina; University of Toronto
- Thesis: Protein complexes and epistatic mini-array profiles (E-MAPs) reveal pathways involved in chromatin function (2006)
- Doctoral advisor: Jack Greenblatt

Nevan J. Krogan is a Canadian molecular and systems biologist. He is a professor and the director of the Quantitative Biosciences Institute (QBI) at the University of California San Francisco (UCSF), as well as a senior investigator at the J. David Gladstone Institutes.

Krogan’s research focuses on developing and using unbiased, quantitative systems approaches to study a wide variety of diseases with the ultimate goal of developing new therapeutics.

== Early life and education ==
Krogan was born in Regina, Saskatchewan, Canada. He obtained his undergraduate degree in chemistry in 1997 and his M.Sc. in biology in 1999 from the University of Regina. Krogan received his Ph.D. in medical genetics at the University of Toronto in 2006 with Jack Greenblatt as his doctoral advisor. During his PhD, he explored the combination of protein-protein and genetic interaction data sets.

== Career ==
Krogan became a Sandler Fellow in 2006 at UCSF, an assistant professor in 2007, and a full professor in 2011. He also became an investigator at the Gladstone Institutes in 2011. He was appointed director of the Quantitative Biosciences Institutes at UCSF in March 2016.

Krogan serves as Director of The HARC Center, an NIH-funded collaborative group that focuses on the structural characterization of HIV-human protein complexes. Krogan is also the co-director of three Cell Mapping initiatives, the Cancer Cell Mapping Initiative (CCMI), the Host Pathogen Map Initiative (HPMI) and the Psychiatric Cell Map Initiative (PCMI). These initiatives map the gene and protein networks in healthy and diseased cells with these maps being used to better understand disease and provide novel therapies to fight them.

In 2020, Krogan led the work to create the SARS-CoV-2 interactome and assembled the QBI Coronavirus Research Group (QCRG) to study SARS-CoV-2 and to find treatments for Covid-19.

Krogan co-established the Institut Pasteur-UCSF Quantitative Biosciences Institute (QBI) Center of Excellence in Emerging Infectious Diseases, a partnership between the University of California, San Francisco (UCSF), and the Institut Pasteur in Paris, France. The Center focuses on pandemic preparedness as well as the prediction and treatment of emerging infectious diseases.

In 2022, Krogan co-founded Rezo Therapeutics, a biotechnology company focused on the integrated mapping of disease networks for precision therapeutics. Rezo Therapeutics is located in the Bay Area and is based on technology from QBI at UCSF.

He has worked alongside the Children of Haiti Project.

== Awards and honors ==
- 2004 – Hannah Farkas-Himsley and Alexander Memorial Award
- 2005 – L. W. Macpherson Microbiology Award
- 2008 – Top 25 authors of high-impact papers in molecular biology and genetics from 2002 to 2006
- 2009 – Searle Scholar, Searle Foundation
- 2009 – Keck Distinguished Young Scholar, W. M. Keck Foundation
- 2014 – Cell Journal Top 40 under 40
- 2017 – The Roddenberry Prize, Roddenberry Foundation
- 2020, 2022 – Clarivate Web of Science, Highly Cited Researchers - ranked in top 1% of citations for field and year
- 2021 – France Legion of Honor, decreed by the President of the French Republic
- 2022 – Elected to EMBO (European Molecular Biology Organization)
- 2022 – Louis Pasteur Medal
- 2023 – Research!America Discovery | Innovation | Health Prize
- 2024 – Cell Press 50 Scientists that Inspire
- 2025 – Einstein Foundation Visiting Fellow
