= Brian Staskawicz =

Plant scientist

- Born: Brian John Staskawicz
- Education: Bates College (BA); Yale University (MS); University of California, Berkeley (PhD)
- Awards: Member of the National Academy of Sciences (1998); Wolf Prize in Agriculture (2025)
- Scientific career
- Workplaces: University of California, Berkeley
- Thesis: Genetics and biochemistry of toxigenicity in Pseudomonas syringae pv. phaseolicola : production, transport, and immunity to phaseolotoxin (1980)
- Website: plantandmicrobiology.berkeley.edu/profile/staskawicz

Brian John Staskawicz ForMemRS is professor of plant and microbial biology at the University of California, Berkeley and scientific director of agricultural genomics at the Innovative Genomics Institute (IGI).

== Education ==
Staskawicz was educated at Bates College (BA, 1974), Yale University (MS, 1976) and the University of California, Berkeley where he completed a PhD in plant pathology in 1980.

== Research and career ==
Staskawicz has made many seminal contributions to the understanding of infection strategies of plant pathogens and immune response of plants. These include the cloning of the first pathogen effector gene and the cloning and characterisation of one of the first plant NOD-like receptors.

Staskawicz and his colleagues also played a major role in establishing Arabidopsis thaliana as a model organism to study the molecular basis of microbial recognition by plants and genetically dissect defense signaling pathways. More recently, he is leading an effort at the IGI in the genome editing of agriculture crops for biotic and abiotic stress resistance and improved plant performance. Work in his laboratory has identified and characterised bacterial effector proteins from both Pseudomonas syringae and Xanthomonas spp.

=== Awards and honours ===
Staskawicz was elected a Foreign Member of the Royal Society (ForMemRS) in 2019. He is a member of the National Academy of Sciences of the US and has been elected a Fellow of both the American Phytopathological Society and the American Academy of Microbiology. In 2025 he was awarded the Wolf Prize in Agriculture.
