= Shinya Yamanaka =

Japanese stem cell researcher (born 1962)

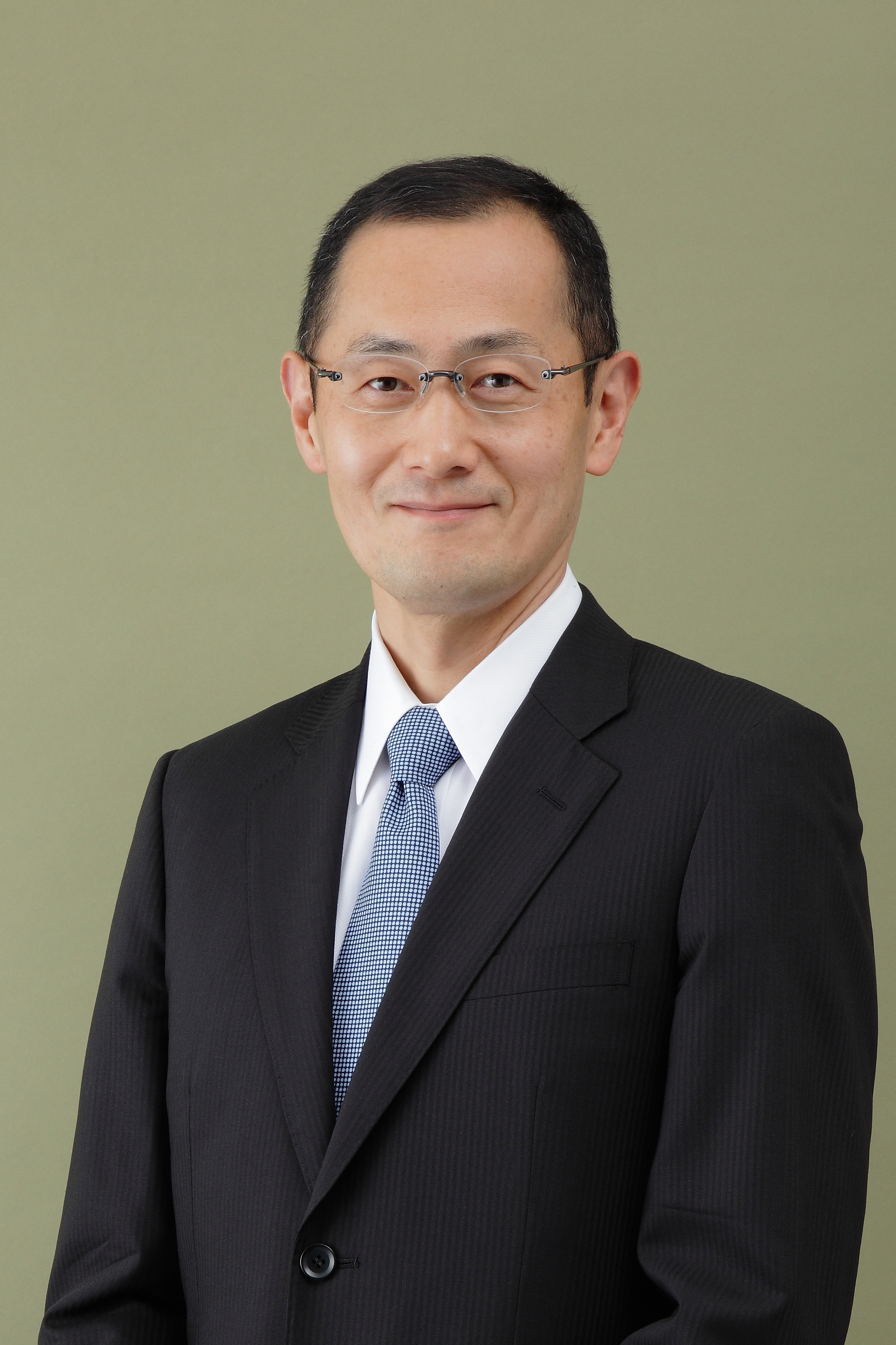
- Yamanaka in 2014
- Born: September 4, 1962 (age 64); Higashiōsaka, Osaka, Japan
- Education: Kobe University (MD); Osaka City University (PhD)
- Known for: Induced pluripotent stem cell
- Awards: Meyenburg Prize (2007); Massry Prize (2008); Robert Koch Prize (2008); Shaw Prize (2008); Gairdner Foundation International Award (2009); Albert Lasker Basic Medical Research Award (2009); Balzan Prize (2010); Kyoto Prize (2010); BBVA Foundation Frontiers of Knowledge Award (2010); Wolf Prize (2011); McEwen Award for Innovation (2011); Fellow of the National Academy of Sciences (2012); Millennium Technology Prize (2012); Nobel Prize in Physiology or Medicine (2012)
- Scientific career
- Fields: Stem cell research
- Workplaces: Kyoto University; Nara Institute of Science and Technology; Gladstone Institute of Cardiovascular disease University of California, San Francisco

Video of a single beating cardiomyocyte, taken from an open-access article co-authored by Yamanaka. Isolating cells by cell type is an important step in stem cell therapy.

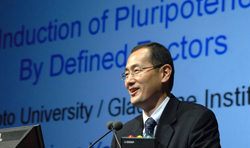
Shinya Yamanaka speaking at a lecture on 2010 January 14

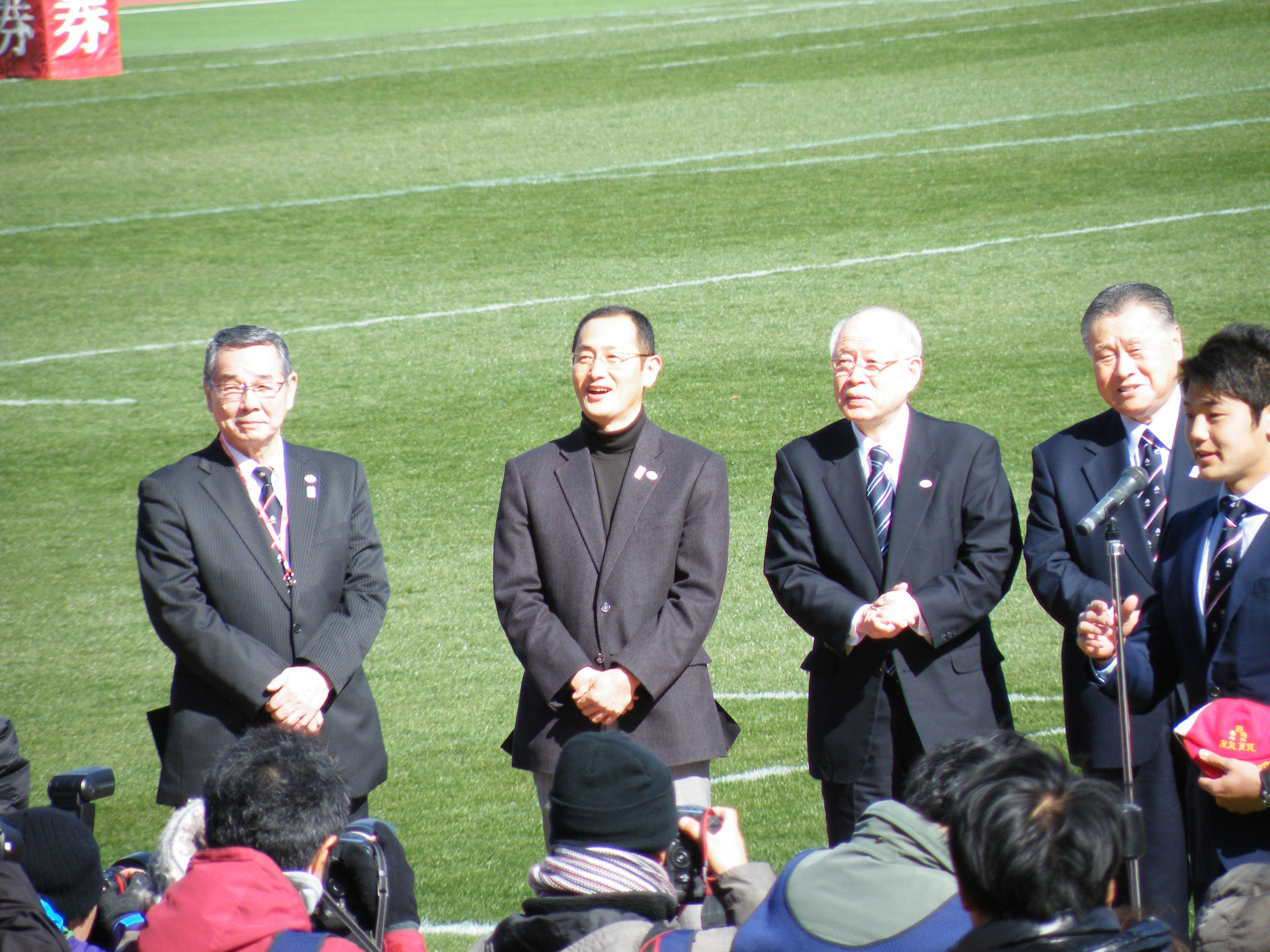
Yamanaka and Ryōji Noyori participating in the ceremony of the 50th All Japan Rugby Football Championship

Shinya Yamanaka (山中 伸弥, Yamanaka Shin'ya; born September 4, 1962) is a Japanese stem cell researcher and a Nobel Prize laureate.

He is a professor and the director emeritus of the Center for iPS Cell (induced Pluripotent Stem Cell) Research and Application, Kyoto University; as well as a senior investigator at the UCSF-affiliated Gladstone Institutes in San Francisco, California, and a professor of anatomy at the University of California, San Francisco (UCSF). Yamanaka is also a past president of the International Society for Stem Cell Research (ISSCR).

He received the 2010 BBVA Foundation Frontiers of Knowledge Award in the biomedicine category, the 2011 Wolf Prize in Medicine with Rudolf Jaenisch, and the 2012 Millennium Technology Prize together with Linus Torvalds.

In 2012, he and John Gurdon were awarded the Nobel Prize for Physiology or Medicine for the discovery that mature cells can be converted to stem cells. In 2013, he was awarded the $3 million Breakthrough Prize in Life Sciences for his work.

== Education ==
Yamanaka was born in Higashiōsaka, Japan, in 1962. After graduating from Tennōji High School attached to Osaka Kyoiku University, he received his M.D. degree at Kobe University in 1987 and his Ph.D. degree at Osaka City University, Graduate School of Medicine in 1993. After this, he went through a residency in orthopedic surgery at National Osaka Hospital and a postdoctoral fellowship at the Gladstone Institute of Cardiovascular disease, San Francisco.

Afterwards, he worked at the Gladstone Institutes in San Francisco, US, and Nara Institute of Science and Technology in Japan. Yamanaka is currently a professor and the director emeritus of Center for iPS Research and Application (CiRA), Kyoto University. He is also a senior investigator at the Gladstone Institutes.

== Professional career ==
Between 1987 and 1989, Yamanaka was a resident in orthopedic surgery at the National Osaka Hospital. Some seniors referred to him as "Jamanaka", a pun on the Japanese word for obstacle.

From 1993 to 1996, he was at the Gladstone Institute of Cardiovascular disease. Between 1996 and 1999, he was an assistant professor at Osaka City University Medical School, but found himself mostly looking after mice in the laboratory, not doing actual research.

When applying for a position at the Nara Institute of Science and Technology (NAIST), he stated that he could and would clarify the characteristics of embryonic stem cells, and this can-do attitude won him the job. From 1999 to 2003, he was an associate professor at the institute, and began the research that would later win him the 2012 Nobel Prize. He became a full professor at NAIST in 2003, remaining until 2005. Between 2004 and 2010, Yamanaka was a professor at the Institute for Frontier Medical Sciences, Kyoto University. Between 2010 and 2022, he was the director and a professor at the center for iPS Cell Research and Application (CiRA), Kyoto University. In April 2022, he stepped down, becoming director emeritus of CiRA, while retaining his professorship.

In 2006, he and his team generated induced pluripotent stem cells (iPS cells) from adult mouse fibroblasts. iPS cells closely resemble embryonic stem cells, the in vitro equivalent of the part of the blastocyst (the embryo a few days after fertilization) which grows to become the embryo proper. They could show that his iPS cells were pluripotent, i.e. capable of generating all cell lineages of the body. Later he and his team generated iPS cells from human adult fibroblasts, again as the first group to do so. A key difference from previous attempts by the field was his team's use of multiple transcription factors, instead of transfecting one transcription factor per experiment. They started with 24 transcription factors known to be important in the early embryo, but could in the end reduce it to four transcription factors – Sox2, Oct4, Klf4 and c-Myc.

20 years later, the Ministry of Health, Labor and Welfare in Japan issued conditional marketing authorization in 2026 to two regenerative medical products developed from reprogrammed iPS cells, undertaking the first ever practical application of iPS cell-derived products.

== Nobel Prize for iPS cell research ==
The 2012 Nobel Prize in Physiology or Medicine was awarded jointly to Yamanaka and John B. Gurdon and "for the discovery that mature cells can be reprogrammed to become pluripotent."

The Center for iPS Cell Research and Application (CiRA) at Kyoto University responded to allegations of image manipulation in several studies co-authored by Nobel laureate Shinya Yamanaka. CiRA stated that questioning Yamanaka's integrity without sufficient evidence was “completely unacceptable.”

=== Background-different cell types ===
There are different types of stem cells.

These are some types of cells that will help in understanding the material.

Cell types	Characteristics
Totipotent cells	Can give rise to all other cell types. Totipotency remains through the first few cell divisions, e.g. the fertilised egg.
Pluripotent cells	Can develop into all cell types (except those that form the amniotic sac and the placenta). For example, the early embryo consists mainly of pluripotent stem cells.
Multipotent cells	Can develop into any of a family of closely related cell types. For example, blood multipotent cells can develop into various blood cells.

=== Background-different stem cell techniques ===
Type	Pros	Cons
Somatic cell replication Embryonic Stem (ES) cell	No immune rejection Theoretically patient-specific transplantations possible	No case of success Many human egg cells needed Ethical issue: Can clone humans
Fertilized egg ES cell	Pluripotent Much research done Immune rejection reducible via stem cell bank	Fertilized egg usage Immune rejection Oncogenic potential (can't use for clinical trial)
Induced pluripotent stem (iPS) Cell	No ethical issue Pluripotent	Oncogenic potential Abnormal aging
Adult stem cell	Much research No immune rejection Safe (clinical trials)	Not as much differentiation potential as ES cell

=== Historical background ===
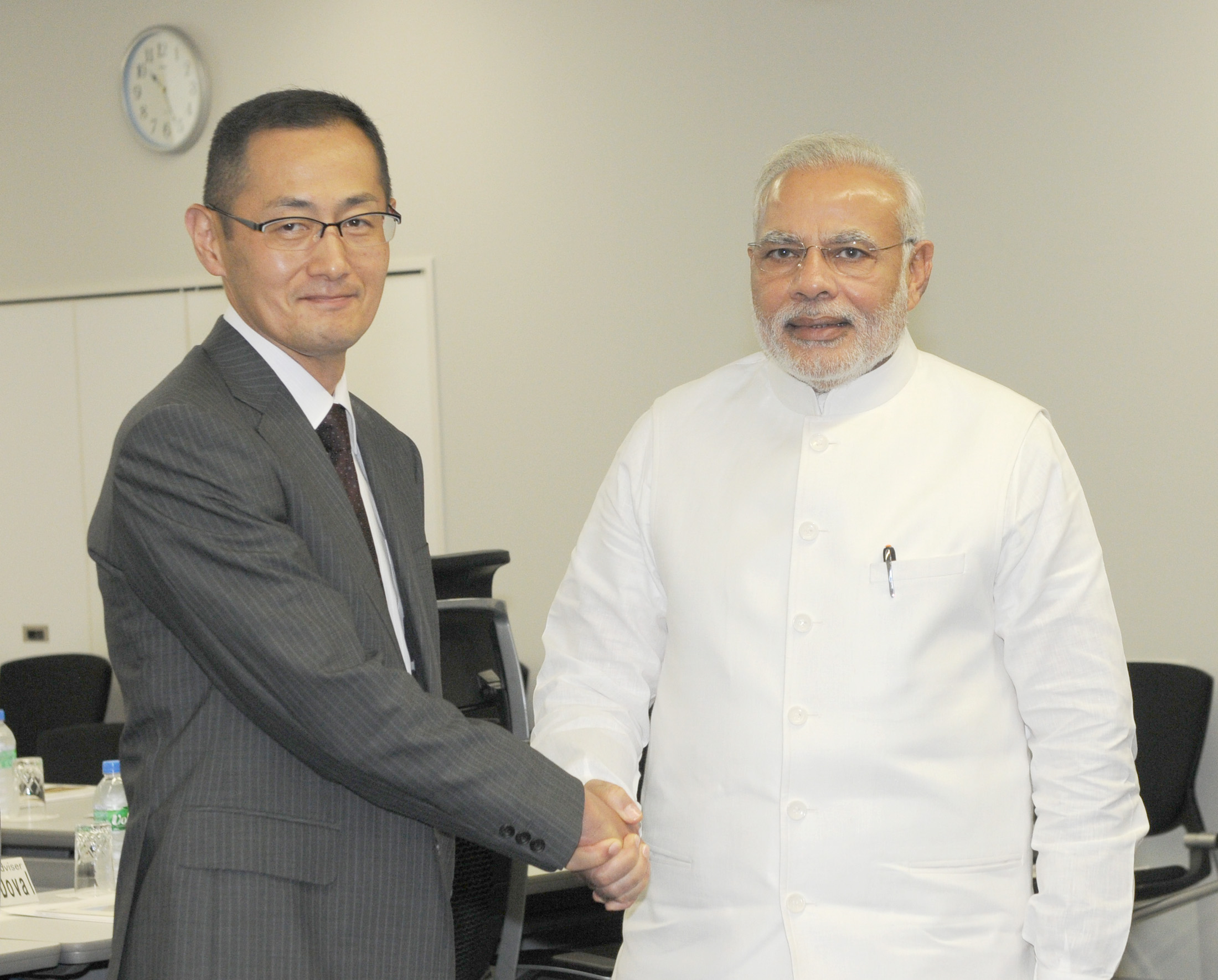
PM Modi during a visit to the stem cell research centre at Kyoto University

The prevalent view during the early 20th century was that mature cells were permanently locked into the differentiated state and cannot return to a fully immature, pluripotent stem cell state. It was thought that cellular differentiation can only be a unidirectional process. Therefore, non-differentiated egg/early embryo cells can only develop into specialized cells. However, stem cells with limited potency (adult stem cells) remain in bone marrow, intestine, skin etc. to act as a source of cell replacement.

The fact that differentiated cell types had specific patterns of proteins suggested irreversible epigenetic modifications or genetic alterations to be the cause of unidirectional cell differentiation. So, cells progressively become more restricted in the differentiation potential and eventually lose pluripotency.

In 1962, John B. Gurdon demonstrated that the nucleus from a differentiated frog intestinal epithelial cell can generate a fully functional tadpole via transplantation to an enucleated egg. Gurdon used somatic cell nuclear transfer (SCNT) as a method to understand reprogramming and how cells change in specialization. He concluded that differentiated somatic cell nuclei had the potential to revert to pluripotency. This was a paradigm shift at the time. It showed that a differentiated cell nucleus has retained the capacity to successfully revert to an undifferentiated state, with the potential to restart development (pluripotent capacity).

Whether an intact differentiated cell could be fully reprogrammed to become pluripotent remained unknown.

=== Yamanaka's research ===
Shinya Yamanaka found that introduction of a small set of transcription factors into a differentiated cell was sufficient to revert the cell to a pluripotent state. Yamanaka focused on factors that are important for maintaining pluripotency in embryonic stem (ES) cells. This was the first time an intact differentiated somatic cell could be reprogrammed to become pluripotent.

Knowing that transcription factors were involved in the maintenance of the pluripotent state, he selected a set of 24 ES cell transcriptional factors as candidates to reinstate pluripotency in somatic cells. First, he collected the 24 candidate factors. When all 24 genes encoding these transcription factors were introduced into skin fibroblasts, few actually generated colonies that were remarkably similar to ES cells.

Secondly, further experiments were conducted with smaller numbers of transcription factors added to identify the key factors, through a very simple and yet sensitive assay system. Lastly, he identified the four key genes. They found that four transcriptional factors (Myc, Oct3/4, Sox2 and Klf4) were sufficient to convert mouse embryonic or adult fibroblasts to pluripotent stem cells (capable of producing teratomas in vivo and contributing to chimeric mice).

These pluripotent cells are called iPS (induced pluripotent stem) cells; they appeared with very low frequency. iPS cells can be selected by inserting the b-geo gene into the Fbx15 locus. The Fbx15 promoter is active in pluripotent stem cells which induce b-geo expression, which in turn gives rise to G418 resistance; this resistance helps us identify the iPS cells in culture.

In 2007, Yamanaka and his colleagues found iPS cells with germline transmission (via selecting for Oct4 or Nanog gene). Also in 2007, they were the first to produce human iPS cells.

Some issues that current methods of induced pluripotency face are the very low production rate of iPS cells and the fact that the 4 transcriptional factors are shown to be oncogenic.

In July 2014, during a scandal involving Japanese stem cell researcher Haruko Obokata fabricating data, doctoring images, and plagiarizing the work of others, Yamanaka faced public scrutiny for his associated work lacking full documentation. Yamanaka denied manipulating images in his papers on embryonic mouse stem cells, but he could not find lab notes to confirm that the raw data was consistent with the published results.

=== Further research and future prospects ===
Since the original discovery by Yamanaka, much further research has been done in this field, and many improvements have been made to the technology. Improvements made to Yamanaka's research as well as future prospects of his findings are as follows:

1. The delivery mechanism of pluripotency factors has been improved. At first retroviral vectors, that integrate randomly in the genome and cause deregulation of genes that contribute to tumor formation, were used. However, now, non-integrating viruses, stabilised RNAs or proteins, or episomal plasmids (integration-free delivery mechanism) are used.
2. Transcription factors required for inducing pluripotency in different cell types have been identified (e.g. neural stem cells).
3. Small substitutive molecules were identified, that can substitute for the function of the transcription factors.
4. Transdifferentiation experiments were carried out. They tried to change the cell fate without proceeding through a pluripotent state. They were able to systematically identify genes that carry out transdifferentiation using combinations of transcription factors that induce cell fate switches. They found transdifferentiation within germ layer and between germ layers, e.g., exocrine cells to endocrine cells, fibroblast cells to myoblast cells, fibroblast cells to cardiomyocyte cells, fibroblast cells to neurons
5. Cell replacement therapy with iPS cells is a possibility. Stem cells can replace diseased or lost cells in degenerative disorders and they are less prone to immune rejection. However, there is a danger that it may introduce mutations or other genomic abnormalities that render it unsuitable for cell therapy. So, there are still many challenges, but it is a very exciting and promising research area. Further work is required to guarantee safety for patients.
6. Can medically use iPS cells from patients with genetic and other disorders to gain insights into the disease process. - Amyotrophic lateral sclerosis (ALS), Rett syndrome, spinal muscular atrophy (SMA), α1-antitrypsin deficiency, familial hypercholesterolemia and glycogen storage disease type 1A. - For cardiovascular disease, Timothy syndrome, LEOPARD syndrome, type 1 and 2 long QT syndrome - Alzheimer's, Spinocerebellar ataxia, Huntington's etc.
7. iPS cells provide screening platforms for development and validation of therapeutic compounds. For example, kinetin was a novel compound found in iPS cells from familial dysautonomia and beta blockers & ion channel blockers for long QT syndrome were identified with iPS cells.

Yamanaka's research has "opened a new door and the world's scientists have set forth on a long journey of exploration, hoping to find our cells' true potential."

In 2013, iPS cells were used to generate a human vascularized and functional liver in mice in Japan. Multiple stem cells were used to differentiate the component parts of the liver, which then self-organized into the complex structure. When placed into a mouse host, the liver vessels connected to the hosts vessels and performed normal liver functions, including breaking down of drugs and liver secretions.

In 2022, Yamanaka factors were shown to effect age related measures in aged mice.

== Recognition ==
In 2007, Yamanaka was recognized as a "Person Who Mattered" in the Time Person of the Year edition of Time magazine. Yamanaka was also nominated as a 2008 Time 100 Finalist. In June 2010, Yamanaka was awarded the Kyoto Prize for reprogramming adult skin cells to pluripotential precursors. Yamanaka developed the method as an alternative to embryonic stem cells, thus circumventing an approach in which embryos would be destroyed.

In May 2010, Yamanaka was given "Doctor of Science honorary degree" by Mount Sinai School of Medicine.

In September 2010, he was awarded the Balzan Prize for his work on biology and stem cells.

Yamanaka has been listed as one of the 15 Asian Scientists To Watch by Asian Scientist magazine on May 15, 2011. In June 2011, he was awarded the inaugural McEwen Award for Innovation; he shared the $100,000 prize with Kazutoshi Takahashi, who was the lead author on the paper describing the generation of induced pluripotent stem cells.

In June 2012, he was awarded the Millennium Technology Prize for his work in stem cells. He shared the 1.2 million euro prize with Linus Torvalds, the creator of the Linux kernel. In October 2012, he and fellow stem cell researcher John Gurdon were awarded the Nobel Prize in Physiology or Medicine "for the discovery that mature cells can be reprogrammed to become pluripotent."

- 2007 – Osaka Science Prize
- 2007 – Inoue Prize for Science
- 2007 – Asahi Prize
- 2007 – Meyenburg Cancer Research Award
- 2008 – Yamazaki-Teiichi Prize in Biological Science & Technology
- 2008 – Robert Koch Prize
- 2008 – Medals of Honor (Japan) (with purple ribbon)
- 2008 – Shaw Prize in Life Science & Medicine
- 2008 – Sankyo Takamine Memorial Award
- 2008 – Massry Prize from the Keck School of Medicine, University of Southern California
- 2008 - Golden Plate Award of the American Academy of Achievement
- 2009 – Lewis S. Rosenstiel Award for Distinguished Work in Basic Medical Research
- 2009 – Gairdner Foundation International Award
- 2009 – Albert Lasker Award for Basic Medical Research
- 2010 – Balzan Prize for Stem Cells: Biology and potential applications
- 2010 – March of Dimes Prize in Developmental Biology
- 2010 – Kyoto Prize in Biotechnology and medical technology
- 2010 – Person of Cultural Merit
- 2010 – BBVA Foundation Frontiers of Knowledge Award in the Biomedicine Category
- 2011 – Albany Medical Center Prize in biomedicine
- 2011 – Wolf Prize in Medicine
- 2011 – King Faisal International Prize for Medicine
- 2011 – McEwen Award for Innovation
- 2012 – Millennium Technology Prize
- 2012 – Fellow of the National Academy of Sciences
- 2012 – Nobel Prize in Physiology or Medicine
- 2012 – Order of Culture
- 2013 – Breakthrough Prize in Life Sciences
- 2013 – Member of the Pontifical Academy of Sciences
- 2014 – UCSF 150th Anniversary Alumni Excellence Awards
- 2016 – Honorable Emeritus Professor, Hiroshima University

== Interest in sports ==
Yamanaka practiced judo (2nd Dan black belt) and played rugby as a university student. He also has a history of running marathons. After a 20-year gap, he competed in the inaugural Osaka Marathon in 2011 as a charity runner with a time of 4:29:53. He took part in Kyoto Marathon to raise money for iPS research since 2012. His personal best is 3:25:20 at 2018 Beppu-Ōita Marathon.

== See also ==
- Catherine Verfaillie
- List of Japanese Nobel laureates
- List of Nobel laureates affiliated with Kyoto University
- Tasuku Honjo

Awards
Preceded by Michael Grätzel	Millennium Technology Prize winner 2012	Succeeded by Stuart Parkin
