= Gladstone Institutes =

American biomedical research organization

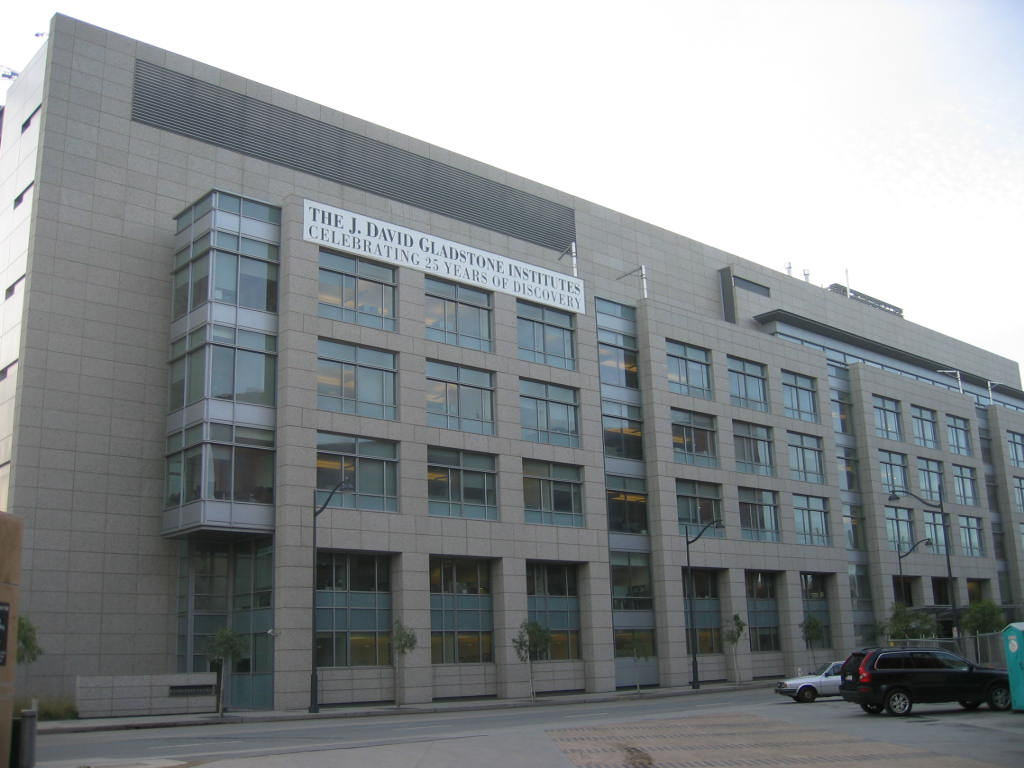
- Established: 1979
- President: Deepak Srivastava
- Faculty: 30
- Staff: 450
- Budget: $80 million
- Address: 1650 Owens St., San Francisco, California
- Location: San Francisco, California, United States
- Coordinates: 37°46′03″N 122°23′39″W
- Interactive map of Gladstone Institutes
- Website: gladstoneinstitutes.org

Gladstone Institutes is an American independent, non-profit biomedical research organization whose focus is to better understand, prevent, treat and cure cardiovascular, viral and neurological conditions such as heart failure, HIV/AIDS and Alzheimer's disease. Its researchers study these diseases using techniques of basic and translational science. Another focus at Gladstone is building on the development of induced pluripotent stem cell technology by one of its investigators, 2012 Nobel Laureate Shinya Yamanaka, to improve drug discovery, personalized medicine and tissue regeneration.

Founded in 1979, Gladstone is academically affiliated with the University of California, San Francisco (UCSF), and located adjacent to UCSF's Mission Bay campus. The organization comprises five major institutes, as well as multiple centers focused on various areas of research.

The current president of the institute is Deepak Srivastava.

== History ==
Gladstone Institutes was founded in 1979 as a research and training facility housed at San Francisco General Hospital. Under inaugural president Robert Mahley—a cardiovascular scientist recruited from the National Institutes of Health—the institutes was launched with a $8 million trust from the late commercial real estate developer, J. David Gladstone.

In 2004 the Gladstone Institutes moved to a new facility in San Francisco's Mission Bay, San Francisco neighborhood.

Dr. Mahley stepped down as president in 2010 to return to active research, and was replaced by R. Sanders Williams (former Dean of the School of Medicine at Duke University). Deepak Srivastava became the institute's third president in January 2018.

In 2011, the S.D. Bechtel, Jr. Foundation helped launch the Center for Comprehensive Alzheimer's Disease Research, while the Roddenberry Foundation helped launch the Roddenberry Stem Cell Center for Biology and Medicine. Also in 2011, the independent and philanthropic Gladstone Foundation formed with the mission of expanding the financial resources for the institutes.

== Organizational structure ==
Gladstone Institutes consists of five institutes:

- Institute of Cardiovascular Disease
- Institute of Virology
- Institute of Neurological Disease
- Institute of Data Science & Biotechnology
- Institute of Genomic Immunology

Gladstone is also home to eight centers for researchers from different institutes to collaborate. These centers focus on stem and iPS cell research, as well as neurodegenerative disease research and therapeutics.

== Research programs ==
=== Cardiovascular disease ===
Gladstone cardiovascular scientists research the spectrum of cardiovascular disease, utilizing developmental, chemical, and stem cell biology approaches, as well as genomics techniques, across a variety of research programs and institutes. Their research has included:

- Determining the genetic factors of congenital birth defects in early heart development
- Studying various methods to repair damaged hearts, including creating heart cells from skin samples and converting scar tissue into muscle.
- Exploring human evolution and metabolism to understand the human genome, and illnesses at the cellular level.
- Studying the effects of COVID-19 on the heart.

=== Virology and immunology ===
In 1991, Gladstone expanded its focus to include virology and immunology in response to the HIV/AIDS crisis. Since then the institute has also studied hepatitis C, Zika virus, and COVID-19. In 2011, Gladstone launched a $25 million initiative around HIV and aging.

Their research has included:

- Leading the global iPrEx study, which led to the FDA approval of Truvada for HIV prevention in 2012.
- Participating as a member of the Martin Delaney Collaboratory to study HIV latency.
- Studying the "accelerated aging" effects associated with HIV/AIDS.
- Studying how HIV integrates and replicates within the body, and how it kills lymphoid CD4 T-cells, the fundamental cause of AIDS.

In 2020, two new institutes were formed; the Gladstone Institute of Virology, and the Gladstone-UCSF Institute of Genomic Immunology, to study how viruses interact with human cells to cause disease.

The Institute of Virology has been involved in research regarding the COVID-19 virus, including its long-term effects on the heart, and studying samples of SARS-CoV-2 variations appearing in California, and their resistances to the Moderna and Pfizer vaccines.

=== Neurological disease ===
Research at Gladstone focuses on major neurological diseases including: Alzheimer's disease, Parkinson's disease, frontotemporal dementia (FTD), Huntington's disease, amyotrophic lateral sclerosis (ALS, or Lou Gehrig's disease) and multiple sclerosis. This research incorporates animal models, electrophysiology, behavioral testing and automated high-throughput analyses. In addition, Gladstone investigators seek to accelerate the movement of basic science discoveries into clinical trials with efforts to bridge the so-called "Valley of Death". The research features an emphasis on the common threads linking the various diseases and treatments for them.

Current research programs include:

- Alzheimer's disease and network disruption. Studying how damage to neurons affects their ability to communicate through chemical and electrical signals, which manifests as sub-clinical epileptic-like seizures. Discovered a link between this process and many of the deficits linked to Alzheimer's disease.
- Alzheimer's disease and apolipoprotein E (apoE). Uncovered the molecular pathways that link apoE and Alzheimer's disease, and identifying new drugs that counteract detrimental effects of apoE4—the most important genetic risk factor for Alzheimer's.
- Alzheimer's disease and tau. Understanding how lowering brain levels of the tau protein improves memory and other cognitive functions in mice genetically engineered to mimic Alzheimer's disease.
- TDP-43. Studying TDP-43, another protein that may contribute to diverse neurodegenerative disorders.
- Protein aggregates and their role in neurodegenerative disease. Helping to uncover the mystery behind protein aggregations—observed in Huntington's disease (inclusion bodies), Parkinson's disease (Lewy bodies), and Alzheimer's disease (neurofibrillary tangles and amyloid-beta plaques)—discovering that rather than being the culprit of neuronal death, these aggregates are part of a defense mechanism that safely sequesters toxin proteins in the brain.
- Investigating the network of brain cells that controls movement, and how its dysfunction leads to the symptoms of Parkinson's disease.
- Mitochondria and synaptic dysfunction. Studying mitochondria, the energy-producing subunits of cells, and their role in multiple neurodegenerative conditions, including Alzheimer's, Parkinson's and ALS.
- researching how autophagy can help prevent the destruction of brain cells, and how the p75 neurotrophin receptor —a protein involved in the development of brain cells— plays unexpected roles in both Alzheimer's and Type 2 diabetes.
- Inflammation and neurodegenerative disease. Studying abnormal inflammatory responses by immune cells in the central nervous system—which may contribute to the progression of multiple sclerosis, neurodegenerative disorders and many other neurological conditions.
- Frontotemporal dementia. Showed a protein called progranulin prevents a type of brain cells from becoming "hyperactive". If not enough progranulin is available the hyperactivity can become toxic and result in extensive inflammation that kills brain cells and can lead to the development of FTD. Also showed that too much of another protein called TDP-43 plays a role in FTD disease progression. Importantly, Gladstone scientists have identified a means to suppress the toxic effects of TDP-43 for FTD and for another neurodegenerative disease: ALS.

=== Stem cell technology ===
Another focus at Gladstone is building on the development of induced pluripotent stem cell technology by one of its senior investigators, 2012 Nobel Laureate Shinya Yamanaka. In 2006, Yamanaka discovered the technology, by which ordinary differentiated adult cells (such as fibroblasts from skin) could be "reprogrammed" into a pluripotent state—i.e., a state similar to embryonic stem cells, which are capable of developing into virtually any cell type in the human body. His discovery of induced pluripotent stem cells, or iPS cells, has since revolutionized the fields of developmental biology, stem cell research and both personalized and regenerative medicine. In 2012 Yamanaka was awarded the Nobel Prize in Physiology or Medicine.

Since Yamanaka's discovery, scientists at Gladstone have used iPS technology to research solutions for Huntington's disease and Alzheimer's disease, as well as create a new model for testing HIV/AIVD vaccines.

Other work at the Data Science & Biotechnology Institute include:

- Reprogramming cardiac connective tissue located in the heart directly into beating cardiac muscle cells.
- Discovering new ways to use chemical compounds to convert cells from one type into another.
- Direct reprogramming of cells into neurons and neural precursor cells.
- Using iPS cells to create human models to research solutions for Huntington's disease and Alzheimer's disease.
- Studying whether the retrotransposons (also known as "jumping genes", because they move around within the chromosomes of a single cell) residing in our DNA become more active when a skin cell is reprogrammed into an iPS cell.

=== Translational research ===
The Gladstone Center for Translational Advancement was formed in 2017, and focuses on drug repositioning; repurposing already-approved drugs for new uses and clinical trials, to speed up (and lower the cost of) drug development.

== Notable researchers ==
Current researchers at the institute include:

- Katerina Akassoglou— Senior Investigator
- Jennifer Doudna — Senior Investigator. Awarded the 2020 Nobel Prize in Chemistry.
- Barbara Engelhardt — Senior Investigator
- Nevan Krogan — Senior Investigator
- Alex Marson — Director, Gladstone-UCSF Institute of Genomic Immunology
- Melanie Ott — Director, Gladstone Institute of Virology
- Katherine Pollard — Director, Gladstone Institute of Data Science and Biotechnology
- Shinya Yamanaka — Senior Investigator. Awarded the 2012 Nobel Prize in Physiology or Medicine.
