= Giroctocogene fitelparvovec =

Experimental gene therapy

Clinical data
- Other names: PF-07055480

Identifiers
- CAS Number: 2166101-71-7
- DrugBank: DB16174
- UNII: C43ZSD4HNV

Giroctocogene fitelparvovec (PF-07055480) is an experimental gene therapy for hemophilia A via a recombinant adeno-associated virus serotype 6-based vector.
