= Alan Wolffe =

English cell biologist

- Born: 21 June 1959; Burton-on-Trent, Staffordshire, England
- Died: 26 May 2001 (aged 41); Rio de Janeiro, Brazil
- Education: University of Oxford
- Scientific career
- Fields: Cell biology

Alan Wolffe (21 June 1959 – 26 May 2001) was an English cell biologist known for his prominent role in establishing that the chromosomal organisation of genes is a dynamic phenomenon determining their expression, cell division and differentiation.

He married Elizabeth and had two children, Max and Katherine.

Wolffe was born on 21 June 1959 in Burton-on-Trent, Staffordshire, England. He was successful at biology early on, receiving the Biological Council Prize upon leaving secondary school. He then attended Oxford University, receiving a first class B.A. degree in 1981. He did his PhD under Prof. Jamshed Tata at the National Institute for Medical Research, London. He was awarded an EMBO long-term postdoctoral fellowship in 1984 and moved to the laboratory of Donald D. Brown at the Department of Embryology, Carnegie Institution of Washington in Baltimore. He joined the National Institute of Health in 1987, working firstly with Gary Felsenfeld in the Laboratory of Molecular Biology (National Institute of Arthritis, Diabetes and Metabolic Diseases). In 1990 he was appointed Chief of the newly founded Laboratory of Molecular Embryology (LME). He left NIH and moved to the biotechnology firm Sangamo BioSciences Inc. in Richmond, California, in 2000, as Senior Vice President and Chief Scientific Officer. He was a prolific writer, publishing hundreds of articles, literature reviews and two books. He is known mainly for his work promoting the idea that chromatin plays a dynamic role in regulating gene expression.

He died as a result of injuries suffered in a road accident in Rio de Janeiro on 26 May 2001.

== Sources ==
http://jcs.biologists.org/cgi/reprint/114/17/3073.pdf Chromatin: Structure and Function Alan Wolffe. ISBN 0-12-761915-1 Cell Volume 105, Issue 7, 29 June 2001, Pages 849-850
