= List of awards and honors received by Jennifer Doudna =

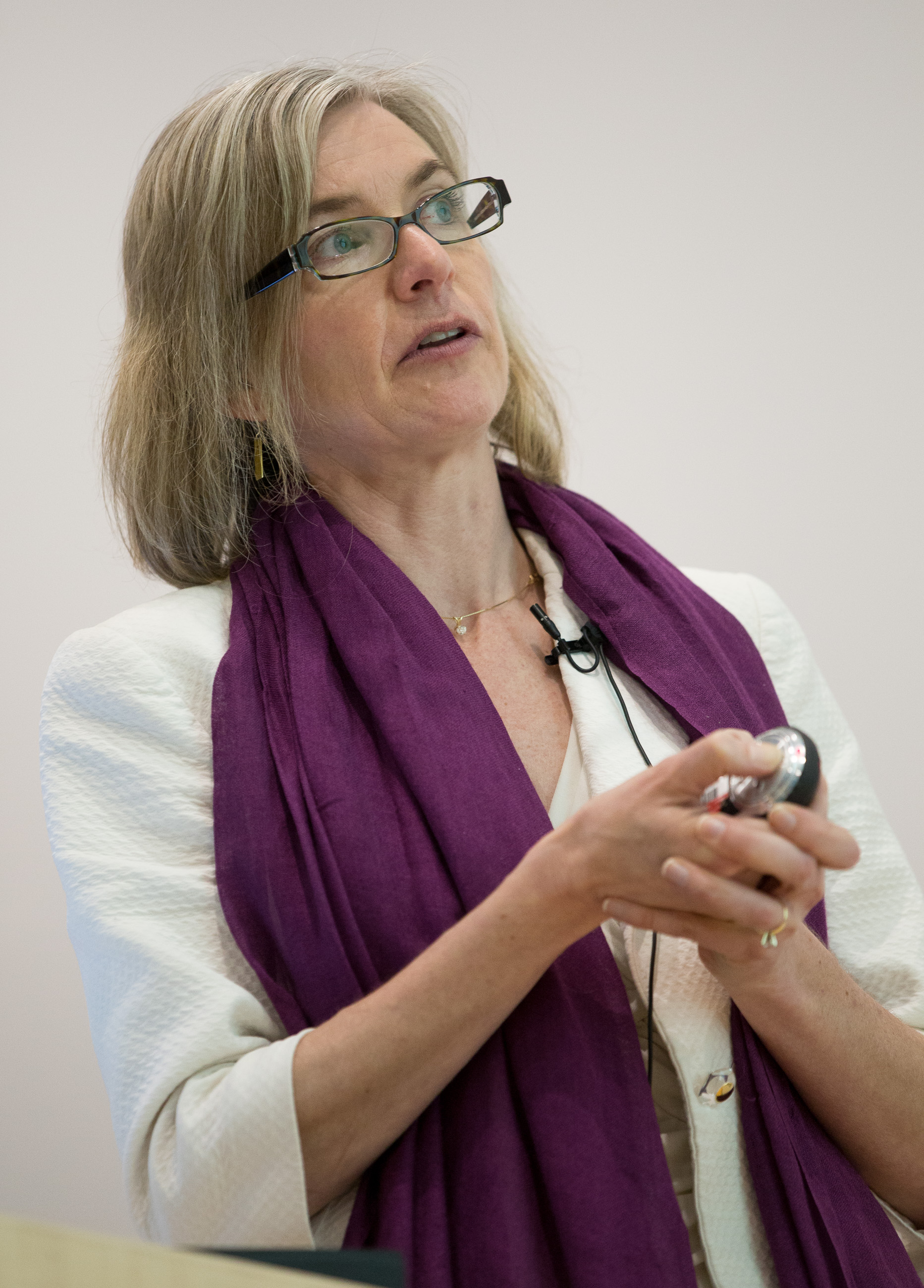
Jennifer Doudna

This list of awards and honors received by Jennifer Doudna comprehensively shows the awards, honors, honorary degrees, fellowships and other recognition received by Jennifer Doudna, an American biochemist at the University of California, Berkeley. She has received many prestigious awards and fellowships for her numerous contributions to biochemistry and genetics, and is most famous for her work on CRISPR-Cas9 genome editing technology. Doudna and Emmanuelle Charpentier were awarded the 2020 Nobel Prize in Chemistry "for the development of a method for genome editing."

== Awards ==
- 1996 Beckman Young Investigators Award
- 1999 NAS Award for Initiatives in Research
- 2000 Alan T. Waterman Award for innovative research that led to the development of a technique that facilitates crystallization of large RNA molecules; for determining the crystal structures of catalytic RNA molecules and an RNA molecule that forms the ribonucleoprotein core of the signal recognition particle; and for deciphering structural features of those molecules that permit a greater understanding of the mechanistic basis of RNA function in both catalysis and protein synthesis.
- 2001 Eli Lilly Award in Biological Chemistry of the American Chemical Society
- 2013 Inaugural recipient of the Mildred Cohn Award in Biological Chemistry from the American Society for Biochemistry and Molecular Biology
- 2014 Jacob Heskel Gabbay Award (jointly with Feng Zhang and Emmanuelle Charpentier)
- 2014 Lurie Prize in Biomedical Sciences from the Foundation for the National Institutes of Health
- 2014 Dr. Paul Janssen Award for Biomedical Research (shared with Charpentier)
- 2015 Breakthrough Prize in Life Sciences (shared with Charpentier) for harnessing an ancient mechanism of bacterial immunity into a powerful and general technology for editing genomes, with wide-ranging implications across biology and medicine.
- 2015 Massry Prize (shared with Charpentier and Philippe Horvath)
- 2015 Princess of Asturias Awards (shared with Charpentier)
- 2015 Gruber Prize in Genetics (shared with Charpentier)
- 2016 Canada Gairdner International Award, with Charpentier, Feng Zhang, Horvath and Rodolphe Barrangou
- 2016 Warren Alpert Foundation Prize (with Charpentier, Rodolphe Barrangou, Horvath and Virginijus Siksnys)
- 2016 Paul Ehrlich and Ludwig Darmstaedter Prize (jointly with Charpentier)
- 2016 Heineken Prize for Biochemistry and Biophysics
- 2016 Tang Prize (jointly with Charpentier and Feng Zhang)
- 2016 HFSP Nakasone Award (jointly with Charpentier)
- 2016 BBVA Foundation Frontiers of Knowledge Award (jointly with Charpentier and Francisco Mojica)
- 2016 L'Oréal-UNESCO Award for Women in Science (jointly with Charpentier)
- 2017 Japan Prize (jointly with Charpentier)
- 2017 F. Albert Cotton Medal
- 2017 Albany Medical Center Prize (jointly with Charpentier, Luciano Marraffini, Francisco Mojica, and Feng Zhang)
- 2017 Carl Sagan Prize for Science Popularization
- 2018 Dickson Prize in Science from Carnegie Mellon University
- 2018 Kavli Prize in Nanoscience (jointly with Charpentier and Siksnys) for the invention of CRISPR-Cas9, a precise nanotool for editing DNA, causing a revolution in biology, agriculture, and medicine.
- 2018 Croonian Medal and Lecture of the Royal Society
- 2018 Pearl Meister Greengard Prize from the Rockefeller University
- 2018 Medal of Honor (jointly with Charpentier, Charis Eng and Michael Thun) of the American Cancer Society
- 2018 Harvey Prize (jointly with Emmanuelle Charpentier and Feng Zhang)
- 2018 Emanuel Merck Lectureship
- 2019 Lui Che Woo Prize in Welfare Betterment Prize
- 2019 Nierenberg Prize
- 2019 Microbiology Society Prize Medal
- 2020 Wolf Prize in Medicine (jointly with Emmanuelle Charpentier)
- 2020 Guggenheim Fellowship
- 2020 Vanderbilt Prize in Biomedical Science
- 2020 Nobel Prize in Chemistry (jointly with Emmanuelle Charpentier) for the development of a method for genome editing.
- 2023 National Inventors Hall of Fame
- 2025 National Medal of Technology and Innovation.
- 2026 Priestley Medal

== Honorary degrees ==
- 2016 Received Doctor of Science as an honorary degree from Yale University
- 2016 Received doctorate honoris causa from KU Leuven, Belgium (together with Emmanuelle Charpentier)
- 2017 Received Doctor of Science honoris causa as an honorary degree from the University of Hong Kong
- 2018 Received an honorary degree from the University of Southern California
- 2019 Received Doctor of Science as an honorary degree from York University
- 2019 Received Doctor of Science as an honorary degree from the University of Oxford
- 2021 Received Doctor of Science as an honorary degree from the University of Chicago

== Memberships and fellowships ==
- 2002 Member, National Academy of Sciences
- 2003 Member, American Academy of Arts and Sciences
- 2010 Member, National Academy of Medicine
- 2014 Fellow, National Academy of Inventors
- 2015 Fellow, American Academy of Microbiology
- 2016 Elected a Foreign Member of the Royal Society (ForMemRS)
- 2021 Member, Pontifical Academy of Sciences
- 2026 Member, National Academy of Engineering

== Other recognition ==
- 2000 Named one of Discover magazine's 20 Young Scientists to Watch
- 2000 Jean Francois LeFevre Memorial Lectureship, CNRS, Strasbourg
- 2000 Robert Burns Woodward Visiting Professor of Chemistry, Harvard University
- 2015 Named one of Time magazine's 100 most influential people in the world, together with Emmanuelle Charpentier
- 2016 Listed as a runner-up for Time Person of the Year, alongside other CRISPR researchers
- 2016 Kavli Lecturer, Council of Scientific Society Presidents (CSSP)
- 2018 George E. Palade Memorial Lecture in Cell Biology, Yale University
- 2018 Forbes' America's Top 50 Women In Tech
- 2021 Forbes 50 Over 50; made up of entrepreneurs, leaders, scientists and creators who are over the age of 50.
