= Intellia Therapeutics =

American biotechnology company

Intellia Therapeutics, Inc.
- Type: Public
- Traded as: Nasdaq: NTLA; Russell 2000 component
- Industry: Biotherapeutics
- Founded: 2014; 12 years ago
- Headquarters: Cambridge, Massachusetts, United States
- Key people: John Leonard (president & CEO); Glenn Goddard (CFO); David Lebwohl (EVP); James Basta (EVP); Laura Sepp-Lorenzino (EVP)
- Revenue: ▲US$52 million (2022)
- Operating income: ▼US$−458 million (2022)
- Net income: ▼US$−474 million (2022)
- Total assets: ▲US$1.52 billion (2022)
- Total equity: ▲US$1.24 billion (2022)
- Number of employees: 598 (2023)
- Website: intelliatx.com

Intellia Therapeutics, Inc. is an American clinical-stage biotechnology company focused on developing novel, potentially curative therapeutics leveraging CRISPR-based technologies. The company's in vivo programs use intravenously administered CRISPR as the therapy, in which the company's proprietary delivery technology enables highly precise editing of disease-causing genes directly within specific target tissues. Intellia's ex vivo programs use CRISPR to create the therapy by using engineered human cells to treat cancer and autoimmune diseases.

The CRISPR gene editing system was originally invented by Jennifer Doudna, one of Intellia's scientific founders, (with colleagues at University of California, Berkeley) and Virginijus Šikšnys (with colleagues at Vilnius University). The company has entered into a number of different research and development collaborations with leading and emerging biotechnology companies including Novartis, Regeneron, Avencell, SparingVision, Kyverna, and ONK Therapeutics.

Intellia has two in vivo programs in ongoing clinical trials.

The first, NTLA-2001, is being tested in two Phase 3 trials: MAGNITUDE, in ATTR cardiomyopathy, and MAGNITUDE-2, in hereditary ATTR polyneuropathy. On 29 October 2025 the FDA put both trials on clinical hold after a MAGNITUDE patient developed grade 4 liver enzyme elevations and raised bilirubin. The patient died on 5 November 2025. The FDA lifted the holds in January 2026 (MAGNITUDE-2) and March 2026 (MAGNITUDE) after Intellia agreed to enhanced liver monitoring.

The second, Lonvo-z, is an investigational CRISPR therapy candidate for the treatment of hereditary angioedema (HAE), currently in Phase 3 studies.

Intellia's proprietary non-viral gene knock out platform deploys lipid nanoparticles to deliver to the liver a two-part genome editing system: guide RNA specific to the disease-causing gene and messenger RNA that encodes the Cas9 enzyme, which carries out the precision editing. Intellia also has a number of research programs for in vivo and ex vivo therapeutic candidates with potential applications in diseases including cancer, alpha-1 antitrypsin deficiency, and hemophilia. The company is also working on a variety of additional gene editing technologies including base editing and DNA writing.

== History ==
Intellia Therapeutics was founded in November 2014 to develop biopharmaceuticals using CRISPR.

It was backed by Atlas Venture and Novartis; the founding CEO was Nessan Bermingham from Atlas and the founding CSO was John Leonard, formerly CSO of AbbVie. The academic scientists involved in the founding included Rodolphe Barrangou, Rachel Haurwitz, Luciano Marraffini, Erik Sontheimer, and Derrick Rossi. The intellectual property around CRISPR was contested from the beginning; Intellia in-licensed patents from Caribou Biosciences, which had licensed patents from University of California invented by Jennifer Doudna.

Novartis had funded the Series A round because of its interest in applying CRISPR in CAR-T, and in January 2015 Novartis and Intellia reached a deal through which Novartis obtained rights to use CRISPR for its CAR-T program, and the companies agreed to collaborate on ways to use CRISPR to treat diseases involving hematopoietic stem cells including beta thalassemia and sickle cell disease. Intellia formed a division called eXtellia Therapeutics to manage the CAR-T collaboration with Novartis.

In December 2016, the company moved to its new 80,000 sq. ft. laboratory and office space in Cambridge, Massachusetts. By that time, it had obtained a license for another company's a lipid nanoparticle drug delivery system to help with its efforts to deliver CRISPR drugs to the liver, without being degraded in the bloodstream; at that time it had not disclosed the licensor.

In March 2017, Intellia and Regeneron, partners in co-developing a CRISPR-based treatment for transthyretin amyloidosis, presented data from a gene editing experiment in mice. By that time, University of California had lost a challenge to Broad's CRISPR patents, putting Intellia at a disadvantage relative to Editas.

In April 2017, Intellia entered into a partnership with Regeneron Pharmaceuticals under which Regeneron gained the exclusive right to use Intellia's CRISPR platform on up to 10 drug targets, of which up to five could be outside of the liver, and the companies agreed to co-develop other targets. Regeneron paid $75 million upfront, as well as milestones and royalties. The company said it planned to put $10 million of the funds into its bioinformatics program, to help it evaluate targets.

In December 2017, John Leonard, who had experience in drug development, took over as CEO.

In October 2019, Intellia named Glenn Goddard as its executive vice president and CFO. Prior to Intellia, Goddard was the CFO at Generation Bio Company and senior vice president of finance at Agios Pharmaceuticals.

In October 2020, Jennifer Doudna, one of Intellia's scientific co-founders, was awarded the 2020 Nobel Prize in Chemistry for the development of the CRISPR/Cas9 genome editing technology. Doudna shared the award with her research collaborator, Emmanuelle Charpentier. This is the first time two women scientists have jointly won a Nobel Prize in Chemistry.

In June 2021, Intellia made history by announcing interim Phase 1 data for NTLA-2001, demonstrating the ability to precisely edit target cells within the body to treat genetic disease with a single intravenous infusion of CRISPR. This was the first time any human clinical data has been published for an in vivo gene editing therapeutic candidate. The landmark data was published in the New England Journal of Medicine in August 2021.

In September and November 2022, Intellia presented the initial positive clinical data from their second in vivo CRISPR-candidate, NTLA-2002 demonstrating for the first time the potential clinical benefits of a CRISPR-based therapy with initial results now available beyond biomarker data. In January 2024, Intellia laid off 15% of its employees. A year later, Intellia announced a 27% net workforce reduction.

== Funding ==
In November 2014, Intellia Therapeutics raised $15 million in Series A round. In September 2015, a Series B round secured $70 million. In May 2016, Intellia announced the closing of its initial public offering which raised approximately $112.1 million. In the course of going public, the company disclosed that it had licensed the lipid drug delivery system from Novartis, and that it involved creating lipid droplets to encapsulate the CRISPR agents.
