= Arlene Sharpe =

American immunologist

Arlene H. Sharpe
- Born: 1953 (age 72–73)
- Education: Harvard College, Harvard Medical School
- Known for: immune checkpoint blockade
- Scientific career
- Fields: Immunology
- Workplaces: Harvard Medical School

Arlene Helen Sharpe (born in 1953) is an American immunologist and Kolokotrones University Professor at Harvard University and Chair of the Department of Immunology at Harvard Medical School. In 2017, she received the Warren Alpert Foundation Prize with Gordon J. Freeman, Lieping Chen, James P. Allison and Tasuku Honjo for their collective contributions to the pre-clinical foundation and development of immune checkpoint blockade, a novel form of cancer therapy that has transformed the landscape of cancer treatment. She served as the hundredth president of the American Association of Immunologists from 2016 to 2017 and served as an AAI Council member from 2013 to 2016. She is the co-director of the Evergrande Center for Immunologic Diseases at Harvard Medical School and Brigham and Women's Hospital.

She graduated from Harvard College and Harvard Medical School.

== Awards and Honours ==
- 1993: Beckman Young Investigators Award
- 2006: Fellow, American Association for Advancement of Science
- 2014: William B. Coley Award for Distinguished Research in Tumor Immunology
- 2017: Warren Alpert Foundation Prize
- 2018: member, National Academy of Sciences
- 2024: Harrington Prize, Harvard
