= Jennifer Doudna =

American biochemist and Nobel laureate (born 1964)

Jennifer Doudna ForMemRS
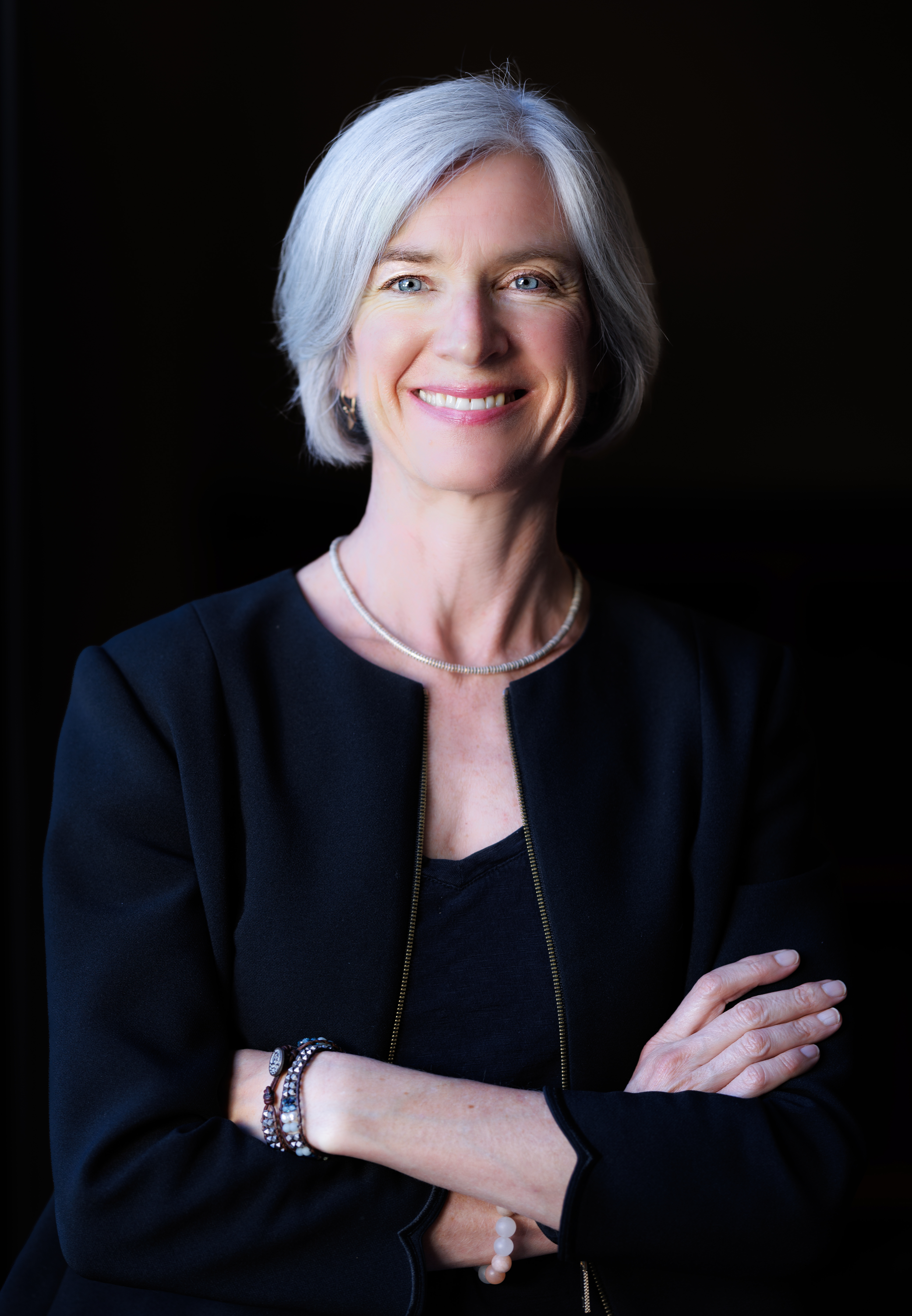
- Doudna in 2023
- Born: Jennifer Anne Doudna; February 19, 1964 (age 62); Washington, D.C., U.S.
- Education: Pomona College (BA); Harvard University (MA, PhD)
- Known for: First X-ray based structure of catalytic RNA; RNA interference; CRISPR
- Spouse(s): Tom Griffin (m. 1988, divorced) Jamie Cate (m. 2000)
- Awards: Alan T. Waterman Award (2000); Jacob Heskel Gabbay Award (2014); Breakthrough Prize in Life Sciences (2015); Princess of Asturias Award (2015); Tang Prize in Biopharmaceutical Science (2016); Japan Prize (2017); Kavli Prize in Nanoscience (2018); Wolf Prize in Medicine (2020); Nobel Prize in Chemistry (2020); Full list
- Scientific career
- Fields: Chemistry
- Workplaces: University of Colorado, Boulder; Yale University; University of California, Berkeley; Gladstone Institutes; University of California, San Francisco
- Thesis: Towards the Design of an RNA Replicase (1989)
- Doctoral advisor: Jack Szostak
- Other academic advisors: Thomas Cech
- Doctoral students: Rachel Haurwitz; Janice Chen; Lei Stanley Qi; Samuel H. Sternberg
- Website: Doudna Lab website Hughes Institute website

Jennifer Anne Doudna ForMemRS (/ˈdaʊdnə/; born February 19, 1964) is an American biochemist who has pioneered work in CRISPR gene editing, and made other fundamental contributions in biochemistry and genetics. She received the 2020 Nobel Prize in Chemistry, with Emmanuelle Charpentier, "for the development of a method for genome editing." She is the Li Ka Shing Chancellor's Chair Professor at the University of California, Berkeley. She has been an investigator with the Howard Hughes Medical Institute since 1997.

In 2012, Doudna and Emmanuelle Charpentier were the first to propose that CRISPR-Cas9 (enzymes from bacteria that control microbial immunity) could be used for programmable editing of genomes, which has been called one of the most significant discoveries in the history of biology. Since then, Doudna has been a leading figure in what is referred to as the "CRISPR revolution" for her fundamental work and leadership in developing CRISPR-mediated genome editing.

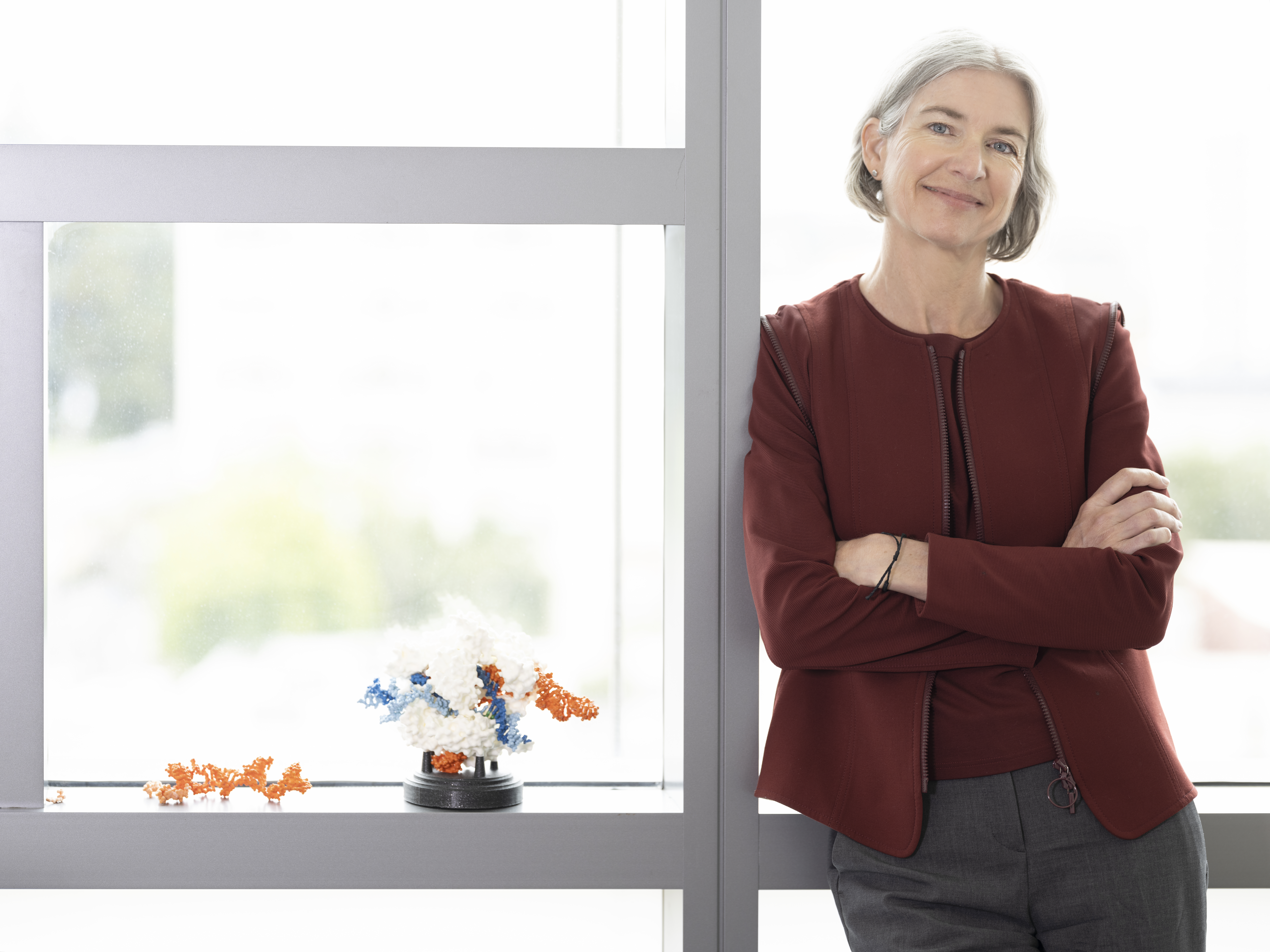
Doudna at the Innovative Genomics Institute

Doudna's awards and fellowships include the 2000 Alan T. Waterman Award for her research on the structure of a ribozyme, as determined by X-ray crystallography and the 2015 Breakthrough Prize in Life Sciences for CRISPR-Cas9 genome editing technology, with Charpentier. She has been a co-recipient of the Gruber Prize in Genetics (2015), the Tang Prize (2016), the Canada Gairdner International Award (2016), and the Japan Prize (2017). She was named one of the Time 100 most influential people in 2015, and in 2023 was inducted into the National Inventors Hall of Fame.

== Early life and education ==
Jennifer Doudna was born February 19, 1964, in Washington, D.C., as the daughter of Dorothy Jane (Williams) and Martin Kirk Doudna. Her father received his Ph.D. in English literature from the University of Michigan, and her mother held a master's degree in education. When Doudna was seven years old, the family moved to Hawaii so her father could accept a teaching position in American literature at the University of Hawaii at Hilo. Doudna's mother earned a second master's degree in Asian history from the university and taught history at a local community college.

Growing up in Hilo, Hawaii, Doudna was fascinated by its flora and fauna. Her father enjoyed reading about science and had books on popular science at home. When Doudna was in the sixth grade, he gave her a copy of James Watson's 1968 book on the discovery of the structure of DNA, The Double Helix, which was a major inspiration. Doudna also developed her interest in science and mathematics in school.

While she attended Hilo High School, Doudna's interest in science was encouraged by her 10th-grade chemistry teacher, Jeanette Wong, whom she has cited as a significant influence in her choice to pursue science. A visiting lecturer on cancer cells further encouraged her pursuit of science as a career choice. She spent a summer working in the University of Hawaii at Hilo lab of noted mycologist Don Hemmes and graduated from Hilo High School in 1981.

Doudna was an undergraduate student at Pomona College in Claremont, California, where she studied biochemistry. During her freshman year, while taking a course in general chemistry, she questioned her own ability to pursue a career in science, and considered switching her major to French as a sophomore. However, her French teacher suggested she stay with science. Chemistry professors Fred Grieman and Corwin Hansch at Pomona had a major impact on her. She started her first scientific research in the lab of professor Sharon Panasenko. She earned her Bachelor of Arts degree in biochemistry in 1985. She chose Harvard Medical School for her doctoral study and earned a Ph.D. in biological chemistry and molecular pharmacology in 1989. Her Ph.D. dissertation was on a system that increased the efficiency of a self-replicating catalytic RNA and was supervised by Jack W. Szostak.

== Career and research ==
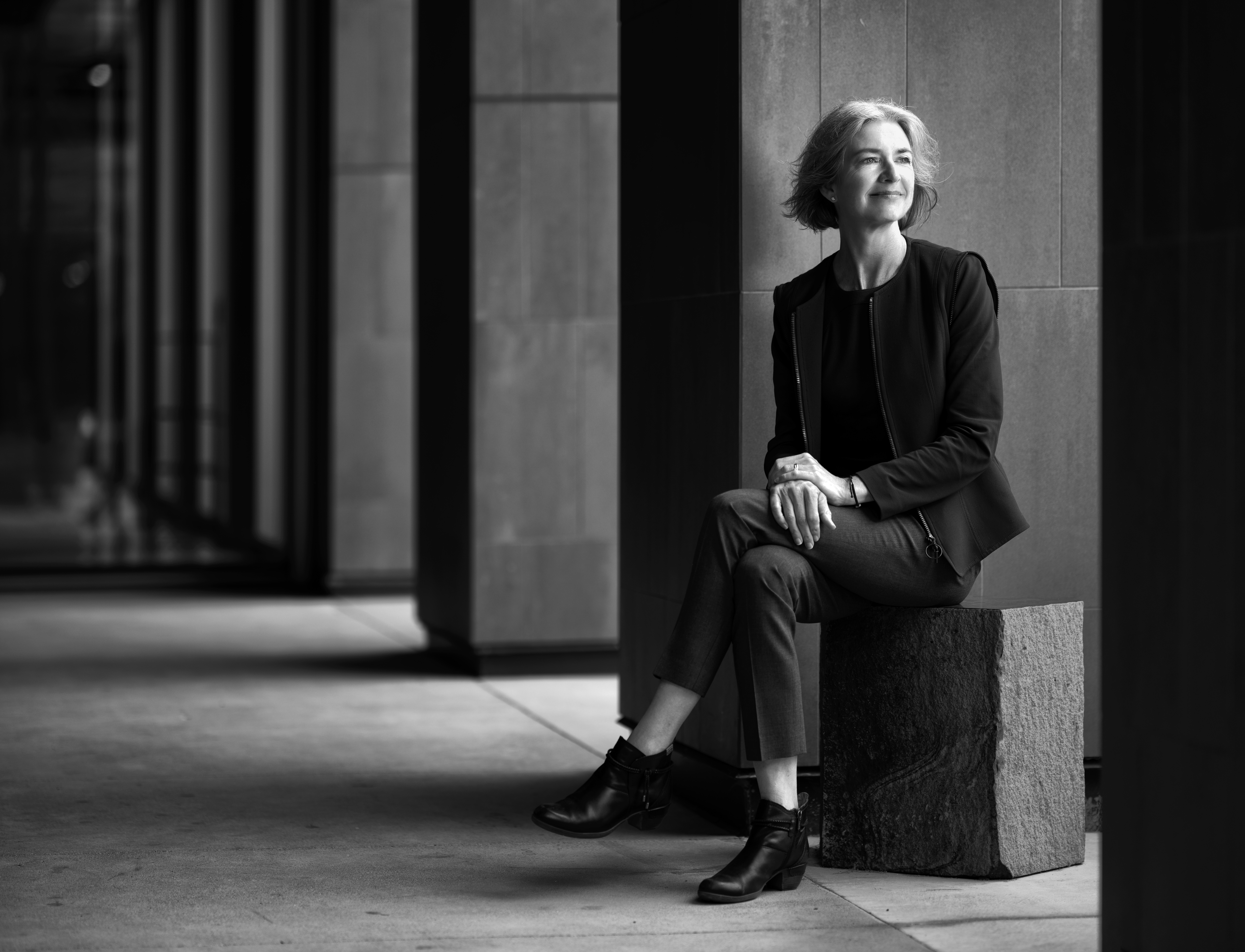
Portrait of Jennifer Doudna by Christopher Michel for the National Academies

After her Ph.D., she held research fellowships in molecular biology at the Massachusetts General Hospital and in genetics at Harvard Medical School. From 1991 to 1994, she was Lucille P. Markey Postdoctoral Scholar in Biomedical Science at the University of Colorado Boulder, where she worked with Thomas Cech. As of 2025, Doudna has an h-index of 166 according to Google Scholar and of 134 according to Scopus.

=== Research on ribozyme structure and function ===
Early in her scientific career, Doudna worked to uncover the structure and biological function of RNA enzymes or ribozymes. While in the Szostak lab, Doudna re-engineered the self-splicing Tetrahymena Group I catalytic intron into a true catalytic ribozyme that copied RNA templates. Her focus was on engineering ribozymes and understanding their underlying mechanisms; however, she came to realize that not being able to see the molecular mechanisms of ribozymes was a major problem. Doudna went to the lab of Thomas Cech at the University of Colorado Boulder to crystallize and determine the three-dimensional structure of a ribozyme for the first time, so ribozyme structure could be compared with that of Enzymes, the catalytic Proteins. She started this project at the Cech lab in 1991 and finished it at Yale University in 1996. Doudna joined Yale's Department of Molecular Biophysics and Biochemistry as an assistant professor in 1994.

=== X-ray diffraction-based structure of active site of a ribozyme at Yale ===
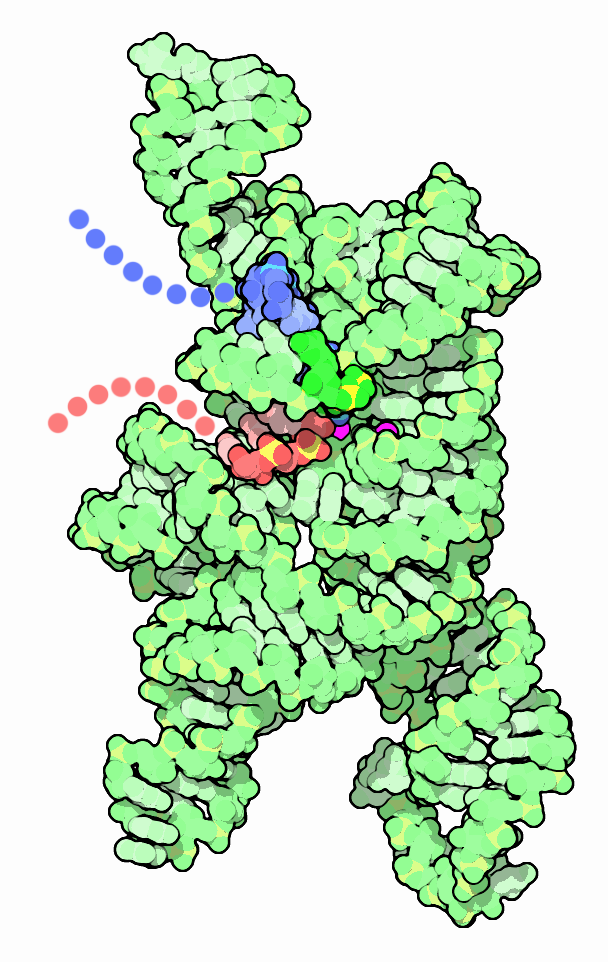
Shape of a self-splicing intron with two exons (shown in red and blue). DS Goodsell, 2005, PDB

At Yale, Doudna's group was able to crystallize and solve the three-dimensional structure of the catalytic core of the Tetrahymena Group I ribozyme. They showed that a core of five magnesium ions clustered in one region of the P4-P6 domain of the ribozyme, forming a hydrophobic core around which the rest of the structure could fold. This is analogous but chemically distinct from, the way proteins typically have a core of hydrophobic amino acids. Her group has crystallized other ribozymes, including the Hepatitis Delta Virus ribozyme. This initial work to solve large RNA structures led to further structural studies on an internal ribosome entry site (IRES) and protein-RNA complexes such as the signal recognition particle.

Doudna was promoted to the position of Professor of Molecular Biophysics and Biochemistry at Yale in 2000. In 2000–2001, she was Robert Burns Woodward Visiting professor of chemistry at Harvard University.

=== Move to Berkeley ===
External videos
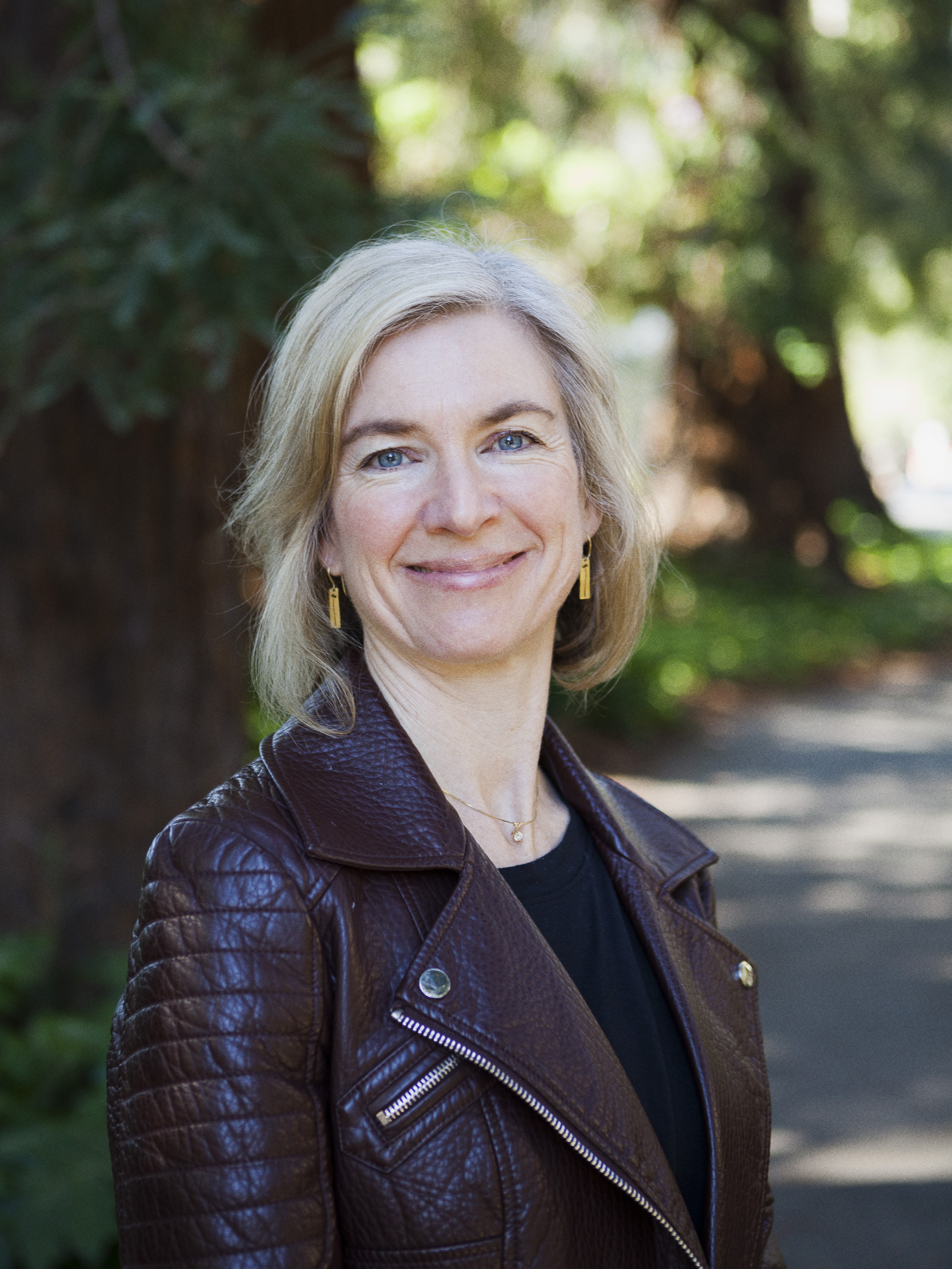
- "CRISPR Biology and Biotechnology: The Future of Genome Editing", Jennifer Doudna delivers the 29th annual Ullyot Public Affairs Lecture, Science History Institute

In 2002, she joined her husband, Jamie Cate, at Berkeley, accepting a position as professor of biochemistry and molecular biology. Doudna also gained access to the synchrotron at Lawrence Berkeley National Laboratory for her experiments with high powered x-ray diffraction.

In 2009, she took a leave of absence from Berkeley to work at Genentech to lead discovery research. She left Genentech after two months and returned to Berkeley with the help of colleague Michael Marletta, canceling all of her obligations to study CRISPR.

In 2015, Doudna founded the Innovative Genomics Institute, a collaboration between Berkeley and UCSF founded by Doudna to develop genome editing technology and apply it to some of society's greatest problems in human health, agriculture and climate change. Doudna holds the Li Ka Shing Chancellor's Professorship in Biomedicine and Health, and is the chair of the Chancellor's Advisor Committee on Biology. Her lab now focuses on the structure and function of CRISPR-Cas systems, developing new genome editing technology and delivery mechanisms for CRISPR therapeutics, and novel techniques for precisely editing microbiomes.

=== CRISPR-Cas9 genome editing discovery ===
Doudna was introduced to CRISPR by Jillian Banfield in 2006 who had found Doudna by way of a Google search, having typed "RNAi and UC Berkeley" into her browser, and Doudna's name came up at the top of the list. In 2012, Doudna and her colleagues made a new discovery that reduces the time and work needed to edit genomic DNA. Their discovery relies on a protein named Cas9 found in the Streptococcus bacterial "CRISPR" immune system that cooperates with guide RNA and works like scissors. The protein attacks its prey, the DNA of viruses, and slices it up, preventing it from infecting the bacterium. This system was first discovered by Yoshizumi Ishino and colleagues in 1987 and later characterized by Francisco Mojica, but Doudna and Emmanuelle Charpentier showed for the first time that they could use different RNAs to program it to cut and edit different DNAs.

As CRISPR becomes increasingly used to edit multicellular organisms, Doudna continues to be called upon to serve as a thought-leader on the ethics of changing an organism's function using CRISPR technology. Their discovery has since been further developed by many research groups for applications ranging from fundamental cell biology, plant, and animal research to treatments for diseases including sickle cell anemia, cystic fibrosis, Huntington's disease, and HIV. Doudna and several other leading biologists called for a worldwide moratorium on any clinical application of gene editing using CRISPR. Doudna supports the usage of CRISPR in somatic gene editing, gene alterations which do not get passed to the next generation, but not germline gene editing.

CRISPR-Cas9 complex

The CRISPR system created a new straightforward way to edit DNA and there was a rush to patent the technique. Doudna and UC Berkeley collaborators applied for a patent and so did a group at the Broad Institute affiliated with the Massachusetts Institute of Technology and Harvard. Feng Zhang at the Broad Institute had shown that CRISPR-Cas9 could edit genes in cultured human cells a few months after Doudna and Charpentier published their method. Before the UC Berkeley patent application was decided, a patent was granted to the Broad investigators and UC Berkeley filed a lawsuit against the decision. In 2017, the court decided in favor of the Broad Institute, who claimed that they had initiated the research earliest and had first applied it to human cell engineering thus supporting editing in human cells with evidence but that the UC Berkeley group had only suggested this application. UC Berkeley appealed on grounds that they had clearly discussed and spelled out how to do the application the Broad had pursued. In September 2018, the appeals court decided in favor of the Broad Institute's patent. Meanwhile, UC Berkeley and co-applicants' patent to cover the general technique was also granted. To further cloud the issue, in Europe the claim of the Broad Institute, to have initiated the research first, was disallowed. The rejection was due to a procedural flaw in the application involving a different set of personnel listed in the lawsuit and the patent application, leading to speculation that the UC Berkeley group would prevail in Europe. Doudna cofounded Caribou Biosciences, a company to commercialize CRISPR technology, in 2011. In September 2013, Doudna cofounded Editas Medicine with Zhang and others despite their legal battles, but she quit in June 2014; Charpentier then invited her to join CRISPR Therapeutics, but she declined following the "divorce"-like experience at Editas. Doudna is also a cofounder of Caribou spin-off Intellia Therapeutics and Scribe Therapeutics, which pioneered CasX, a more compact, next-generation Cas9 which can efficiently cut DNA.

In 2017, with Samuel H. Sternberg, she co-authored A Crack in Creation: Gene Editing and the Unthinkable Power to Control Evolution, a rare case of the first-person account of a major scientific breakthrough, aimed at the general public.

In addition to the CRISPR breakthrough, Doudna has discovered that the hepatitis C virus utilizes an unusual strategy to synthesize viral proteins. This work could lead to new drugs to stop infections without causing harm to the tissues of the body.

"I have so much optimism about what CRISPR can do to help cure unaddressed genetic diseases and improve sustainable agriculture, but I'm also concerned that the benefits of the technology might not reach those who need it most if we're not thoughtful and deliberate about how we develop the technology," Doudna said.

=== Mammoth Biosciences ===
In 2017, Doudna co-founded Mammoth Biosciences, a San Francisco-based bioengineering tech startup. Initial funding raised $23 million, with a series B round of funding in 2020 raising $45 million. The business is focused on improving access to bio sensing tests which address "challenges across healthcare, agriculture, environmental monitoring, biodefense, and more."

=== COVID-19 response ===
Beginning in March 2020, Doudna organized an effort to use CRISPR-based technologies to address the COVID-19 pandemic along with Dave Savage, Robert Tjian, Fyodor Urnov, Patrick Hsu, and other colleagues at the Innovative Genomics Institute (IGI), where they also created a testing center. This center processed over 500,000 patient samples from UC Berkeley students, staff and faculty as well as members of the surrounding community and farm workers in the Salinas area. Mammoth Biosciences announced a peer-reviewed validation of a rapid, CRISPR-based point of need COVID-19 diagnostic which is faster and less expensive than qRT-PCR based tests.

=== Other activities ===
She is also the founder and chair of the governance board of the Innovative Genomics Institute, which she co-founded in 2014. Doudna is also a faculty scientist at Lawrence Berkeley National Laboratory (LBNL), a senior investigator at the Gladstone Institutes, and an adjunct professor of cellular and molecular pharmacology at the University of California, San Francisco (UCSF). In 2025, a new supercomputer named after Doudna was announced for the National Energy Research Scientific Computing Center at LBNL, intended as the successor to the Perlmutter supercomputer.

Doudna is on the scientific advisory boards of the companies that she cofounded, such as Caribou, Intellia, Mammoth, and Scribe; as well as others such as Altos Labs, Isomorphic Labs, Johnson & Johnson, Synthego, Tempus AI, and Welch Foundation. She joined Sixth Street Partners in 2022 as its chief science advisor, to guide investment decisions related to CRISPR. In 2026, Doudna said she planned to spend more time mentoring younger scientists and reduce the size of her lab to allow more time for working with trainees.

== Personal life ==
Doudna's first marriage was in 1988 to a fellow graduate student at Harvard named Tom Griffin, but they divorced a few years later. Griffin wanted to move to Boulder, Colorado, where Doudna was also interested in working with Thomas Cech. As a postdoctoral researcher at the University of Colorado, Doudna met Jamie Cate, then a graduate student. They worked together on the project to crystallize and determine the structure of the Tetrahymena Group I intron P4-P6 catalytic region. Doudna brought Cate with her to Yale, and they married in Hawaii in 2000. Cate later became a professor at the Massachusetts Institute of Technology and Doudna followed him to Boston at Harvard, but in 2002 they both accepted faculty positions at Berkeley and moved there together; Cate preferred the less formal environment on the West Coast from his earlier experiences at the University of California, Santa Cruz and the Lawrence Berkeley National Laboratory, and Doudna liked that Berkeley is a public university. Cate is a Berkeley professor and works on gene-editing yeast to increase their cellulose fermentation for biofuel production. Doudna and Cate have a son born in 2002 who attends UC Berkeley, studying electrical engineering and computer science. They live in Berkeley.

== Awards and honors ==
Doudna was a Searle Scholar and received the 1996 Beckman Young Investigators Award. In 2000, she was awarded the Alan T. Waterman Award, the National Science Foundation's highest honor that annually recognizes an outstanding researcher under the age of 35, for her structure determination of a ribozyme. In 2001, she received the Eli Lilly Award in Biological Chemistry of the American Chemical Society (ACS).

In 2015, together with Emmanuelle Charpentier, she received the Breakthrough Prize in Life Sciences for her contributions to CRISPR/Cas9 genome editing technology. In 2016, together with Charpentier, Feng Zhang, Philippe Horvath and Rodolphe Barrangou, she received the Canada Gairdner International Award. Also in 2016, she received the Heineken Prize for Biochemistry and Biophysics. She has also been a co-recipient of the Gruber Prize in Genetics (2015), the Tang Prize (2016), the Japan Prize (2017) and the Albany Medical Center Prize (2017). In 2018, Doudna was awarded the NAS Award in Chemical Sciences, the Pearl Meister Greengard Prize from the Rockefeller University, and a Medal of Honor from the American Cancer Society. Also in 2018, she was awarded the Kavli Prize in Nanoscience (jointly with Emmanuelle Charpentier and Virginijus Šikšnys). In 2019, she received the Harvey Prize of the Technion/Israel for the year 2018 (jointly with Emmanuelle Charpentier and Feng Zhang) and the LUI Che Woo Prize in the category of Welfare Betterment. In 2020, she received the Wolf Prize in Medicine (jointly with Emmanuelle Charpentier). Also in 2020, Doudna and Charpentier were awarded the Nobel Prize in Chemistry "for the development of a method for genome editing." In 2025, she was awarded the National Medal of Technology and Innovation and was named the recipient of the 2026 Priestley Medal by the ACS. She was elected a member of the National Academy of Engineering in 2026.

She was elected to the National Academy of Sciences in 2002, the American Academy of Arts and Sciences in 2003, the National Academy of Medicine in 2010 and the National Academy of Inventors in 2014. In 2015, together with Charpentier, she became a fellow of the American Academy of Microbiology. She was elected a Foreign Member of the Royal Society (ForMemRS) in 2016. In 2017, Doudna was awarded the Golden Plate Award of the American Academy of Achievement. In 2020, she was awarded a Guggenheim Fellowship. In 2021 she received the Award for Excellence in Molecular Diagnostics from the Association for Molecular Pathology. In 2021, Pope Francis appointed Doudna, and two other women Nobel laureates Donna Strickland and Emmanuelle Charpentier, as members of the Pontifical Academy of Sciences.

She along with Charpentier was named one of the Time 100 most influential people in 2015, and she was a runner-up for Time Person of the Year in 2016 alongside other CRISPR researchers. In 2018 and 2023, she received honorary Doctor of Science degrees from USC and Harvard, respectively.

== Bibliography ==
- Isaacson, Walter (2021). "Introduction – Into the Breach". The Code Breaker: Jennifer Doudna, Gene Editing, and the Future of the Human Race. Simon & Schuster. ISBN 978-1-9821-1585-2.
