= Warren Alpert Foundation Prize =

Award for physicians

The Warren Alpert Foundation Prize is awarded annually to scientist(s) whose scientific achievements have led to the prevention, cure or treatment of human diseases or disorders, and/or whose research constitutes a seminal scientific finding that holds great promise of ultimately changing our understanding of or ability to treat disease. The prize was established in 1987 by the late philanthropist and businessman Warren Alpert and the Warren Alpert Foundation.

The Warren Alpert Prize is given internationally and since its inception, 10 winners have gone on to win Nobel Prizes.

The prize is administered in concert with Harvard Medical School in Boston, Massachusetts and the Warren Alpert Foundation, located in Providence, Rhode Island. An annual symposium is held at Harvard Medical School each fall where the recipient(s) present their work. The prize currently includes $500,000, a citation and plaque.

== Warren Alpert Foundation Prize Recipients ==
Year	Recipient(s)	Citation	Nationality
2026	Daniel Bauer, Stuart Orkin, Vijay G. Sankaran, Swee Lay Thein, John Tisdale	For enabling curative genetic therapies for individuals with the major hemoglobin disorders, Sickle Cell Disease (SCD) and beta-thalassemia. In rigorous studies over two decades, they discovered how to reactivate production of fetal hemoglobin in adults, and optimized hematopoietic cell reconstitution procedures, bringing molecularly based therapies to patients.	United States; United Kingdom; United States
2025	Tomas Cihlar, John Link, Wesley Sundquist	For their critical contributions understanding the structure and function of the HIV capsid and to the discovery and development of lenacapavir, the first approved drug to disrupt a viral capsid and whose potency and twice yearly dosing regimen has the potential to significantly accelerate the end of the HIV epidemic.	Czech Republic; United States; United States
2024	Renier Brentjens, Zelig Eshhar, Carl H. June, Michel Sadelain	For pioneering applications of chimeric antigen receptors to engineer T cells for adoptive immunotherapy of cancer and autoimmunity.	United States, Israel; United States; France
2023	David J. Lipman	For his visionary work in the conception, design, and implementation of computational tools, databases, and infrastructure that transformed the way biological information is analyzed and accessed freely and rapidly around the world.	United States
2022	Katalin Karikó, Drew Weissman, Eric Huang, Uğur Şahin, Özlem Türeci	For transformational discoveries into the biology of mRNA, for its modification for medicinal use, and for the design of mRNA-based COVID-19 vaccines.	United States; Germany
2021	Lynne Maquat, Joan Steitz	For the discovery of fundamental pathways and mechanisms that ensure accurate RNA splicing and quality control of gene expression involving RNA.	United States
2020	Daniel Drucker, Joel Habener, Jens Juul Holst	For identifying Glucagon-like peptides and leading the field with studies extending from cells to humans, culminating in the development of these peptides as therapeutic agents for treating diabetes and short bowel syndrome.	Canada; United States; Denmark
2019	Ed Boyden, Karl Deisseroth, Peter Hegemann, Gero Miesenböck	For pioneering work in the field of optogenetics, a revolutionary technique that uses light and genetic modification to control the activity of cells in the brain.	United States; Germany; Austria
2018	Francis Collins, Paul Negulescu, Bonnie Ramsey, Lap-Chee Tsui, Michael J. Welsh	For identifying faulty gene behind devastating disease, development of precision-targeted therapies	United States; China
2017	Arlene Sharpe, Harvard Medical School, Gordon J. Freeman, Dana Farber Cancer Institute, Lieping Chen, Yale University, James P. Allison, University of Texas M.D. Anderson Cancer Center, Tasuku Honjo, Kyoto University	For their collective contributions to the pre-clinical foundation and development of immune checkpoint blockade, a novel form of cancer therapy that has transformed the landscape of cancer treatment.	United States; Japan
2016	Rodolphe Barrangou, North Carolina State University, Philippe Horvath, DuPont, Jennifer Doudna, University of California, Berkeley, Emmanuelle Charpentier, Max Planck Institute for Infection Biology and Umeå University, Virginijus Šikšnys, Vilnius University Institute of Biotechnology	For their remarkable contributions to the understanding of the CRISPR bacterial defense system and the revolutionary discovery that it can be adapted for genome editing	France; United States; Lithuania
2015	Ruth Sonntag Nussenzweig and Victor Nussenzweig, NYU Langone Medical Center, Tu Youyou of the China Academy of Chinese Medical Sciences, Beijing	For their pioneering discoveries in chemistry and parasitology, and their personal commitment to translating these discoveries into effective chemotherapeutic and vaccine-based approaches to controlling malaria	Brazil; China
2014	Oleh Hornykiewicz, Medical University of Vienna, Roger A. Nicoll, University of California, San Francisco, Solomon H. Snyder, Johns Hopkins School of Medicine	For seminal contributions to our understanding of neurotransmission and neurodegeneration.	Austria; United States
2013	David Botstein, Princeton University, Ronald W. Davis, Stanford University School of Medicine, and David Hogness, Stanford University School of Medicine	For their seminal contributions to the concepts and methods of creating a genetic map in the human, and of positional cloning, leading to the identification of thousands of human disease genes and ushering in the era of human genetics.	United States
2012	Julian Adams, Infinity Pharmaceuticals, Kenneth C. Anderson, Dana–Farber Cancer Institute, Alfred L. Goldberg, Harvard Medical School, and Paul G. Richardson, Dana–Farber Cancer Institute	For the discovery, preclinical and clinical development of bortezomib to FDA approval and front line therapy for the treatment of patients with multiple myeloma.	United States
2011	Alain Carpentier, Hôpital Européen Georges-Pompidou, and Robert Langer, Massachusetts Institute of Technology	For their application of bioengineering principles to fundamental improvements in human health.	France; United States
2009-2010	Howard Green, Harvard Medical School	For development of methodologies for the expansion and differentiation of human keratinocyte stem cells for permanent skin restoration in victims of extensive burns.	United States
2008	Lloyd Aiello, Joslin Diabetes Center	For the discovery, characterization and implementation of laser panretinal photocoagulation, which is used to treat proliferative diabetic retinopathy	United States
2007	Harald zur Hausen and Lutz Gissmann, German Cancer Research Center	For work leading to the development of a vaccine against human papillomavirus.	Germany
2006	Dennis Slamon, UCLA; Robert Weinberg, MIT; Michael Shepard, Receptor BioLogix, Inc; and Axel Ullrich, Center for Molecular Medicine,	For their work in identifying HER-2/neu as an oncogene and development of the anti-HER-2/neu monoclonal antibody Herceptin for breast cancer therapy.	United States Germany
2005	M. Judah Folkman, Harvard Medical School and Boston Children's Hospital	For discovering tumor angiogenesis, and for pioneering work in the development of antiangiogenic therapies for cancer.	United States
2004	Susan Band Horwitz, Albert Einstein College of Medicine	For her seminal contributions to the understanding of how the antitumor agent Taxol kills cancer cells.	United States
2003	Sidney Pestka, University of Medicine and Dentistry of New Jersey Robert Wood Johnson Medical School, David Goeddel, Tularik, Inc., and Charles Weissmann, Imperial College School of Medicine, London	For purification and characterization of interferon alpha; cloning of the human interferon alpha gene and mass production of recombinant interferon alpha for cancer treatment and treatment of hepatitis C.	United Kingdom; United States
2002	Alfred Sommer, Johns Hopkins University Bloomberg School of Public Health	For epidemiologic insight into the effects of Vitamin A deficiency, and the resulting reduction in childhood mortality worldwide.	United States
2001	Eugene Braunwald, Harvard Medical School, and Barry Coller, Rockefeller University School of Medicine.	For work in cardiac physiology and pathophysiology, leading to the use of monoclonal antibodies to platelet surface antigens in antithrombotic therapy.	United States
2000	David Baltimore, California Institute of Technology, Brian Druker, Oregon Health Sciences University, Nicholas Lydon, Amgen, Inc., Alex Matter, Novartis Pharma AG, and Owen Witte, University of California, Los Angeles.	For Development of Abl kinase inhibitors for use in the treatment of chronic myelogenous leukemia	United States; Switzerland
1999	Michael S. Brown and Joseph L. Goldstein, University of Texas Southwestern Medical School, Akira Endo (biochemist), Tokyo Noko University	For Development of HMG CoA reductase inhibitors.	United States Japan
1998	K. Frank Austen, Harvard Medical School	For elucidating the role of leukotrienes in asthma.	United States
1997	Robert C. Gallo, University of Maryland School of Medicine, and Luc Montagnier, Queens College, New York	For isolation of the Human Immunodeficiency Virus.	United States; France
1996	Leo Sachs, Weizmann Institute of Science, and Donald Metcalf, University of Melbourne	For discovery of blood cell growth factors.	Israel; Australia
1995	John A. Clements, University of California, San Francisco	For discovery of lung surfactant, and development of synthetic lung surfactant therapy for Infant Respiratory Distress Syndrome.	United States
1994	J.R. Warren, Royal Perth Hospital, and Barry J. Marshall, University of Virginia	For linking gastric ulcers to the H. pylori bacterium.	Australia
1993	Stuart H. Orkin, Harvard Medical School.	For genetic and molecular mechanisms of Βeta-Thalassemia and other blood disorders.	United States
1992	Roscoe O. Brady, National Institutes of Health	For treatment for Gaucher's Disease.	United States
1991	David W. Cushman and Miguel A. Ondetti, Bristol Myers-Squibb	For ACE inhibitor therapy for hypertension and heart failure.	United States; Argentina
1990	No prize awarded.		
1989	Yuet Wai Kan, University of California, San Francisco	For prenatal genetic screening for blood diseases.	United States
1988	Louis Kunkel, Harvard Medical School	For discovery of the gene associated with a major form of muscular dystrophy.	United States
1987	Kenneth Murray (biologist), University of Edinburgh	For development of a vaccine against Hepatitis B.	Scotland

== See also ==
- List of biomedical science awards
