= Haurwitz =

Haurwitz is a surname. Notable people with the surname include:

- Bernhard Haurwitz (1905–1986), German-born American meteorologist and physicist
- Rachel Haurwitz (born 1985), American biochemist and structural biologist
