= Wesley Sundquist =

American biochemist (born 1959)

Wesley I. Sundquist
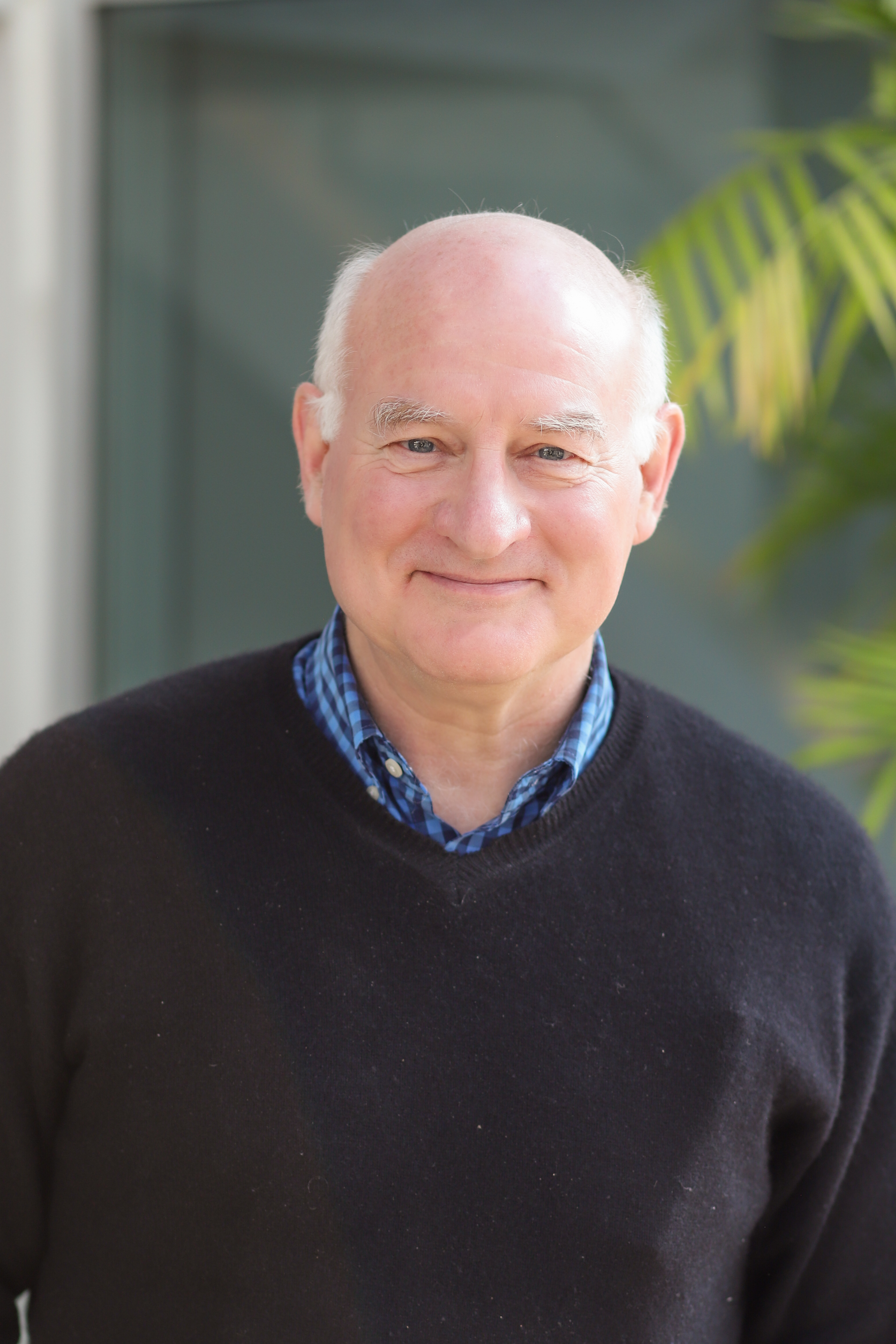
- Sundquist in December, 2024
- Born: September 11, 1959 (age 66); Saint Paul, Minnesota, US
- Education: Carleton College (BA; 1981); Massachusetts Institute of Technology (PhD; 1988)
- Known for: Research in HIV assembly and membrane remodeling
- Spouse: Nola Sundquist
- Children: 2
- Awards: Louisa Gross Horwitz Prize (2024); TIME100: The Most Influential People of 2025; Warren Alpert Foundation Prize (2025)
- Scientific career
- Fields: Structural biology, biochemistry, virology, cell biology
- Institutions: University of Utah (1992) MRC Laboratory of Molecular Biology

Wesley Ian Sundquist is an American biochemist. Sundquist is Samuels Chair, Distinguished Professor, and Chair of the University of Utah Department of Biochemistry. Sundquist's research focuses on cellular, molecular and structural biology of retroviruses, particularly Human Immunodeficiency Virus (HIV), and on cellular membrane remodeling by the Endosomal Sorting Complexes Required for Transport (ESCRT) pathway.

== Early life, education, and career ==
Sundquist was born in Saint Paul, Minnesota on September 11, 1959. He grew up in Saint Paul and Washington, D.C. He received his bachelor's degree in chemistry from Carleton College in Minnesota in 1981. Sundquist completed a PhD in chemistry at the Massachusetts Institute of Technology with Stephen J. Lippard in 1988. He was then a postdoctoral fellow at the MRC Laboratory of Molecular Biology in Cambridge, England with Sir Aaron Klug. In 1992, Sundquist joined the University of Utah Department of Biochemistry.

== Research ==
The HIV capsid encloses the viral RNA genome and facilitates viral replication. Sundquist and colleagues defined the unusual fullerene cone architecture of the viral capsid and identified essential functions of the capsid in HIV-1 replication, which helped enable development of the potent and long-lasting Lenacapavir capsid inhibitor by Gilead Sciences. The Sundquist lab also reconstituted capsid-dependent HIV reverse transcription and integration in a cell-free system.

To spread infection, viruses must shed from infected cells. Sundquist and colleagues found that retroviruses like HIV exit cells using the host ESCRT pathway. They also used this information to design new proteins that can assemble into nanocages, exit producer cells, and carry cargoes into new target cells.

Cytokinesis separates one replicating cell into two daughter cells. Sundquist's lab studies this process by determining the structures and functions of factors that act to complete and regulate cytokinesis.

== Honors and awards ==
- Searle Scholars Award (1993)
- ASBMB-Amgen Award for the application of biochemistry and molecular biology to the understanding of disease (2003)
- Member of the American Academy of Arts and Sciences (2011)
- Member of National Academy of Sciences (2014)
- Rosenblatt Prize for Excellence (2017)
- Fellow of the American Society of Biochemistry and Molecular Biology (2021)
- Louisa Gross Horwitz Prize (2024)
- Mani L. Bhaumik Breakthrough of the Year Award (2025)
- TIME100: The Most Influential People of 2025
- Warren Alpert Foundation Prize (2025)
- World Laureate Association Prize (2025)

== Personal life ==
Sundquist met his wife Nola in 1983 when they were graduate students at MIT, and they were married in 1987. As of 2025, their son Christopher is a Corporate and Securities Attorney at the Gunderson Detmer Law Firm in Boston and their daughter Emily is a resident in the family practice at Lawrence Family Health Center in Lawrence, MA.
