= Francisco Mojica =

Spanish microbiologist (born 1963)

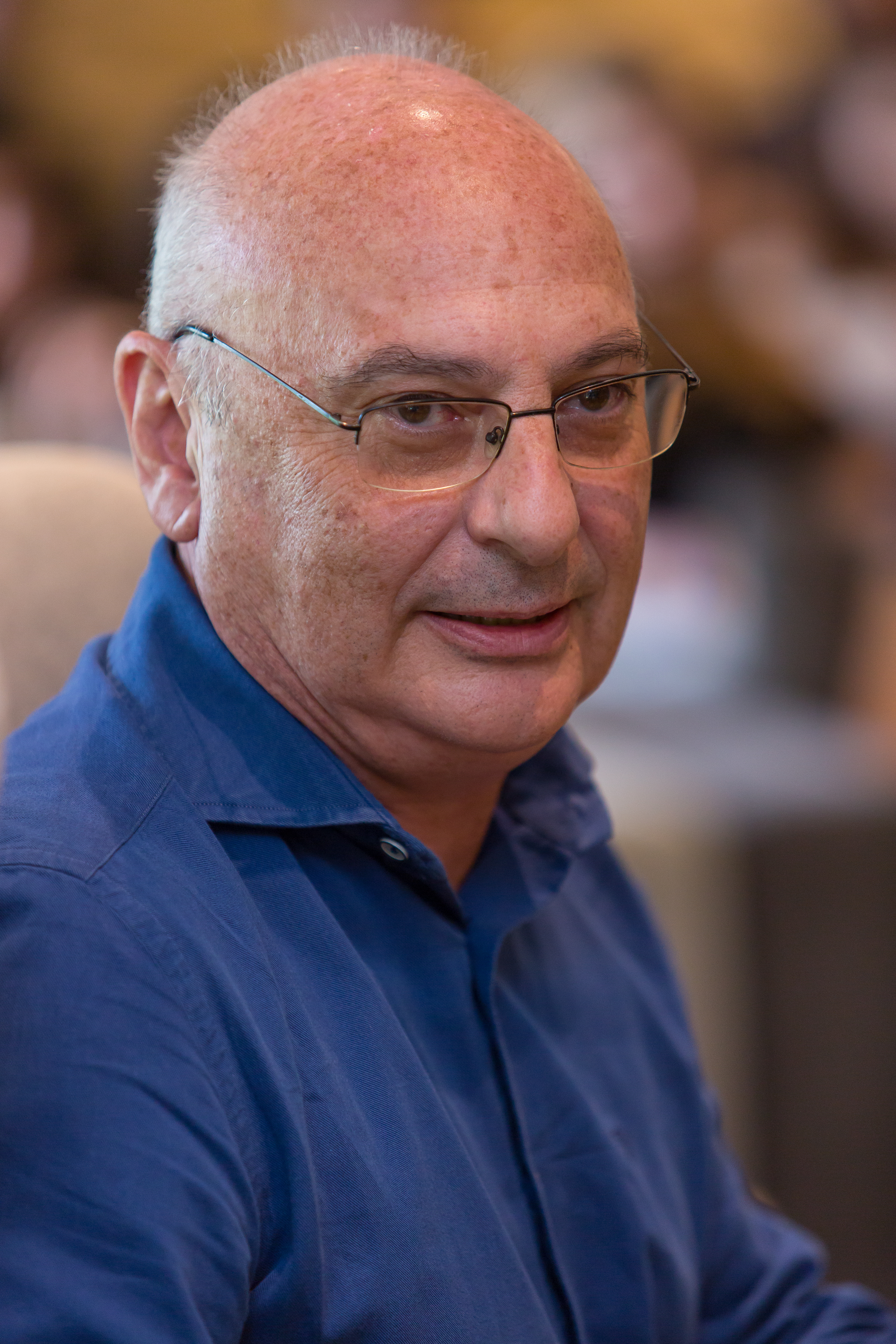
- Born: Francisco Juan Martínez Mojica; 5 October 1963 (age 63); Elche, Spain
- Education: University of Valencia, University of Alicante
- Known for: Discovery of CRISPR
- Scientific career
- Fields: Molecular biology, microbiology
- Workplaces: University of Alicante

Francisco Juan Martínez Mojica (Note: In this Spanish name, the first or paternal surname is Martínez and the second or maternal family name is Mojica.) (born 5 October 1963) is a Spanish molecular biologist and microbiologist at the University of Alicante in Spain. He is known for his discovery of repetitive, functional DNA sequences in bacteria which he named CRISPR (Clustered Regularly Interspaced Short Palindromic Repeats). These were later developed into the first widespread genome editing tool, CRISPR-Cas9.

== Early life and education ==
Mojica was born in Elche, Spain, on 5 October 1963. He attended Los Andes elementary school, Vázquez de Mella school, and Instituto Carrus high school. He enrolled first at the University of Murcia to study biology and later moved to the University of Valencia (BS, 1986) and University of Alicante (PhD, 1993). During his doctoral studies, he visited Paris-Sud University. He then received post-doctoral training at the University of Utah and the University of Oxford. Since 1994, Mojica has been a faculty member at the University of Alicante, where he has focused on molecular microbiology, which led to his discovery of the CRISPR system.

== Career and research ==
=== The discovery of CRISPR ===
Mojica was the first researcher to characterize what is now called a CRISPR locus, reported in 1993. Part of the sequence was reported previously by Yoshizumi Ishino in 1987. Mojica described the complete gene sequence repeats in the archaeal organisms Haloferax and Haloarcula species, and studied their function. He continued research on these sequences throughout the 1990s, and in 2000, Mojica recognized that what had been reported as disparate repeat sequences actually shared a common set of features, now known to be the hallmarks of CRISPR sequences. He coined the term CRISPR through correspondence with Ruud Jansen of Utrecht University, proposing the acronym of Clustered Regularly Interspaced Short Palindromic Repeats to alleviate the confusion stemming from the numerous acronyms used to describe the sequences in scientific literature.

=== CRISPR as a microbial immune system ===
In 2003, Mojica wrote the first paper suggesting that CRISPR was an innate microbial immune system. The paper was rejected by a series of high-profile journals, including Nature, Proceedings of the National Academy of Sciences, Molecular Microbiology and Nucleic Acids Research, before finally being accepted by Journal of Molecular Evolution in February 2005.

=== Connections and disconnections with Alexander Fleming ===
It is pertinent to note that the development of this method has broadly followed a similar course to that of penicillin. In 1929, Alexander Fleming pioneered the discovery of its antibiotic capacity and later, in 1935, Howard Florey and Ernst Chain developed its therapeutic application. In 1945, the Nobel Prize in Medicine was awarded jointly to the three aforementioned professionals. At the mention of the word "penicillin", the general population associates this term with the scientist Fleming, who is recognized as the pioneer in its discovery. In relation to the remarkable CRISPR gene-editing method, the opposite situation occurs in the case of Alexander Fleming. As far as penicillin is concerned, the acknowledgements are for its pioneer, but for the CRISPR method, few have remembered the pioneer of this method, Francisco Mojica.

== Awards and honors ==
- Albany Medical Center Prize, 2017.
- PLuS Alliance to Global Innovation, King's College London, 2017.
- BBVA Foundation Frontiers of Knowledge Award in Biomedicine (shared with Emmanuelle Charpentier and Jennifer Doudna), 2017.

=== Honorary Degrees received ===
- Polytechnic University of Valencia, Spain, 2017.
- National University of Quilmes, Argentina, 2018.
- University of Valencia, Spain, 2018.
- Menéndez Pelayo International University, Spain, 2019.
- University of Murcia, Spain, 2019.

== Publications ==
(A selection from those mentioned in the institutional page of the Universidad de Alicante, its list of research publications by Mojica, and those referred by Lander in the article The Heroes of CRISPR)

- Mojica, Francisco J. M.; Garrett, Roger A. (13 December 2012). "Discovery and Seminal Developments in the CRISPR Field". CRISPR-Cas Systems. Berlin, Heidelberg: Springer Berlin Heidelberg. doi:10.1007/978-3-642-34657-6_1. ISBN 978-3-642-34656-9.
- Mojica, F. J. M.; Juez, G.; Rodriguez-Valera, F. (1993). "Transcription at different salinities of Haloferax mediterranei sequences adjacent to partially modified PstI sites". Molecular Microbiology. 9 (3). Wiley: 613–621. doi:10.1111/j.1365-2958.1993.tb01721.x. ISSN 0950-382X. PMID 8412707. S2CID 23548049.
- Mojica, F.J.M.; Ferrer, C.; Juez, G.; Rodríguez-Valera, F. (1995). "Long stretches of short tandem repeats are present in the largest replicons of the Archaea Haloferax mediterranei and Haloferax volcanii and could be involved in replicon partitioning". Molecular Microbiology. 17 (1). Wiley: 85–93. doi:10.1111/j.1365-2958.1995.mmi_17010085.x. ISSN 0950-382X. PMID 7476211. S2CID 24330250.
- Mojica, Francisco J. M.; Diez-Villasenor, Cesar; Soria, Elena; Juez, Guadalupe (2000). "Biological significance of a family of regularly spaced repeats in the genomes of Archaea, Bacteria and mitochondria". Molecular Microbiology. 36 (1). Wiley: 244–246. doi:10.1046/j.1365-2958.2000.01838.x. ISSN 0950-382X. PMID 10760181. S2CID 22216574.
- Mojica, Francisco J.M.; Dı́ez-Villaseñor, Chc)sar; Garcı́a-Martı́nez, Jesús; Soria, Elena (2005). "Intervening Sequences of Regularly Spaced Prokaryotic Repeats Derive from Foreign Genetic Elements". Journal of Molecular Evolution. 60 (2). Springer Science and Business Media LLC: 174–182. Bibcode:2005JMolE..60..174M. doi:10.1007/s00239-004-0046-3. ISSN 0022-2844. PMID 15791728. S2CID 27481111.
- Mojica, Francisco J. M.; Garrett, Roger A. (13 December 2012). "Discovery and Seminal Developments in the CRISPR Field". CRISPR-Cas Systems. Berlin, Heidelberg: Springer Berlin Heidelberg. doi:10.1007/978-3-642-34657-6_1. ISBN 978-3-642-34656-9.
- Makarova, Kira S.; Wolf, Yuri I.; Alkhnbashi, Omer S.; Costa, Fabrizio; Shah, Shiraz A.; Saunders, Sita J.; Barrangou, Rodolphe; Brouns, Stan J. J.; Charpentier, Emmanuelle; Haft, Daniel H.; Horvath, Philippe; Moineau, Sylvain; Mojica, Francisco J. M.; Terns, Rebecca M.; Terns, Michael P.; White, Malcolm F.; Yakunin, Alexander F.; Garrett, Roger A.; van der Oost, John; Backofen, Rolf; Koonin, Eugene V. (28 September 2015). "An updated evolutionary classification of CRISPR–Cas systems". Nature Reviews Microbiology. 13 (11). Springer Science and Business Media LLC: 722–736. doi:10.1038/nrmicro3569. ISSN 1740-1526. PMC 5426118. PMID 26411297.
- García-Gutiérrez, Enriqueta; Almendros, Cristóbal; Mojica, Francisco J. M.; Guzmán, Noemí M.; García-Martínez, Jesús (2 July 2015). Wang, Tony (ed.). "CRISPR Content Correlates with the Pathogenic Potential of Escherichia coli". PLOS ONE. 10 (7) e0131935. Public Library of Science (PLoS). Bibcode:2015PLoSO..1031935G. doi:10.1371/journal.pone.0131935. ISSN 1932-6203. PMC 4489801. PMID 26136211.
- Almendros, Cristóbal; Mojica, Francisco J. M. (2015). "Exploring CRISPR Interference by Transformation with Plasmid Mixtures: Identification of Target Interference Motifs in Escherichia coli". Methods in Molecular Biology. Vol. 1311. New York, NY: Springer New York. pp. 161–170. doi:10.1007/978-1-4939-2687-9_10. ISBN 978-1-4939-2686-2. ISSN 1064-3745. PMID 25981472.
- Almendros, Cristóbal; Mojica, Francisco J. M.; Díez-Villaseñor, César; Guzmán, Noemí M.; García-Martínez, Jesús (28 February 2014). Davies, Julian E. (ed.). "CRISPR-Cas Functional Module Exchange in Escherichia coli". mBio. 5 (1). American Society for Microbiology: e00767-13. doi:10.1128/mbio.00767-13. ISSN 2161-2129. PMC 3903273. PMID 24473126.
- Mojica, Francisco J.M.; Díez-Villaseñor, César (2013). "Right of admission reserved, no matter the path". Trends in Microbiology. 21 (9). Elsevier BV: 446–448. doi:10.1016/j.tim.2013.06.003. ISSN 0966-842X. PMID 23810125.
- Shah, Shiraz A.; Erdmann, Susanne; Mojica, Francisco J.M.; Garrett, Roger A. (12 February 2013). "Protospacer recognition motifs". RNA Biology. 10 (5). Informa UK Limited: 891–899. doi:10.4161/rna.23764. ISSN 1547-6286. PMC 3737346. PMID 23403393.
- Díez-Villaseñor, César; Guzmán, Noemí M.; Almendros, Cristóbal; García-Martínez, Jesús; Mojica, Francisco J.M. (27 February 2013). "CRISPR-spacer integration reporter plasmids reveal distinct genuine acquisition specificities among CRISPR-Cas I-E variants ofEscherichia coli". RNA Biology. 10 (5). Informa UK Limited: 792–802. doi:10.4161/rna.24023. ISSN 1547-6286. PMC 3737337. PMID 23445770.
- Almendros, Cristóbal; Guzmán, Noemí M.; Díez-Villaseñor, César; García-Martínez, Jesús; Mojica, Francisco J. M. (26 November 2012). Mokrousov, Igor (ed.). "Target Motifs Affecting Natural Immunity by a Constitutive CRISPR-Cas System in Escherichia coli". PLOS ONE. 7 (11) e50797. Public Library of Science (PLoS). Bibcode:2012PLoSO...750797A. doi:10.1371/journal.pone.0050797. ISSN 1932-6203. PMC 3506596. PMID 23189210.
- Garcia-Heredia, Inmaculada; Martin-Cuadrado, Ana-Belen; Mojica, Francisco J. M.; Santos, Fernando; Mira, Alex; Antón, Josefa; Rodriguez-Valera, Francisco (30 March 2012). Liles, Mark R. (ed.). "Reconstructing Viral Genomes from the Environment Using Fosmid Clones: The Case of Haloviruses". PLOS ONE. 7 (3) e33802. Public Library of Science (PLoS). Bibcode:2012PLoSO...733802G. doi:10.1371/journal.pone.0033802. ISSN 1932-6203. PMC 3316494. PMID 22479446.
- Makarova, Kira S.; Haft, Daniel H.; Barrangou, Rodolphe; Brouns, Stan J. J.; Charpentier, Emmanuelle; Horvath, Philippe; Moineau, Sylvain; Mojica, Francisco J. M.; Wolf, Yuri I.; Yakunin, Alexander F.; van der Oost, John; Koonin, Eugene V. (9 May 2011). "Evolution and classification of the CRISPR–Cas systems". Nature Reviews Microbiology. 9 (6). Springer Science and Business Media LLC: 467–477. doi:10.1038/nrmicro2577. ISSN 1740-1526. PMC 3380444. PMID 21552286.
- Mojica, Francisco J. M.; Díez-Villaseñor, César (2010). "The on-off switch of CRISPR immunity against phages in Escherichia coli". Molecular Microbiology. 77 (6). Wiley: 1341–1345. doi:10.1111/j.1365-2958.2010.07326.x. ISSN 0950-382X. PMID 20860086. S2CID 30143543.
- Miquel, Sylvie; Peyretaillade, Eric; Claret, Laurent; de Vallée, Amélie; Dossat, Carole; Vacherie, Benoit; Zineb, El Hajji; Segurens, Beatrice; Barbe, Valerie; Sauvanet, Pierre; Neut, Christel; Colombel, Jean-Frédéric; Medigue, Claudine; Mojica, Francisco J. M.; Peyret, Pierre; Bonnet, Richard; Darfeuille-Michaud, Arlette (17 September 2010). Ahmed, Niyaz (ed.). "Complete Genome Sequence of Crohn's Disease-Associated Adherent-Invasive E. coli Strain LF82". PLOS ONE. 5 (9) e12714. Public Library of Science (PLoS). Bibcode:2010PLoSO...512714M. doi:10.1371/journal.pone.0012714. ISSN 1932-6203. PMC 2941450. PMID 20862302.
- Díez-Villaseñor, C.; Almendros, C.; García-Martínez, J.; Mojica, F. J. M. (1 May 2010). "Diversity of CRISPR loci in Escherichia coli". Microbiology. 156 (5). Microbiology Society: 1351–1361. doi:10.1099/mic.0.036046-0. ISSN 1350-0872.
- Mojica, F. J. M.; Díez-Villaseñor, C.; García-Martínez, J.; Almendros, C. (1 March 2009). "Short motif sequences determine the targets of the prokaryotic CRISPR defence system". Microbiology. 155 (3). Microbiology Society: 733–740. doi:10.1099/mic.0.023960-0. ISSN 1350-0872. PMID 19246744.
