= Samuel H. Sternberg =

American biochemist

- Education: Columbia University (B.A.); University of California, Berkeley (Ph.D.)
- Known for: CRISPR–Cas systems, discovery of CRISPR-associated transposons, genome engineering, science communication
- Awards: NIH Director’s New Innovator Award; Alfred P. Sloan Research Fellowship; Pew Biomedical Scholar; (Other awards can be added)
- Scientific career
- Fields: Biochemistry, Molecular Biophysics, Genome Engineering
- Workplaces: Columbia University
- Thesis: Mechanism and engineering of CRISPR-associated endonucleases (2014)
- Doctoral advisor: Jennifer A. Doudna

Samuel H. Sternberg is an American protein–RNA biochemist known for his research on CRISPR–Cas gene editing technology. He is an associate professor in the Department of Biochemistry and Molecular Biophysics at Columbia University and an Investigator with the Howard Hughes Medical Institute. His research focuses on the molecular mechanisms of CRISPR–Cas systems and the development of genome engineering tools. In addition, Dr. Sternberg is known for his science communication efforts, including public lectures and media appearances discussing the ethical and societal implications of genome editing.

== Early life and education ==
Sternberg was born and raised in Lancaster, Pennsylvania. He earned his B.A., in biochemistry from Columbia University in 2007, graduating summa cum laude, and later received his Ph.D. in chemistry from the University of California, Berkeley in 2014, where he worked in the laboratory of Professor Jennifer A. Doudna.

== Career ==
After completing his doctoral studies, Sternberg worked briefly as a postdoctoral researcher and later as a Scientist and Group Leader at Caribou Biosciences, a biotechnology company specializing in genome engineering applications. In February 2018, he began his independent academic career at Columbia University, where he holds an appointment in the Department of Biochemistry and Molecular Biophysics. His laboratory investigates the mechanisms of CRISPR–Cas systems, including the discovery of CRISPR-associated transposons, and develops new tools for genome engineering.

In addition to his research publications, he is a co-author (with Jennifer Doudna) of the book A Crack in Creation, which discusses the discovery and implications of CRISPR technology.

Other contributions include:

- Demonstrating the mechanism of RNA-guided DNA targeting by CRISPR–Cas9, elucidating how Cas9 interrogates and cleaves DNA with high specificity.
- Contributing to the discovery and characterization of CRISPR-associated transposons that enable RNA-guided DNA integration, thereby expanding the toolkit available for genome engineering.
- Developing methodologies to improve the specificity of CRISPR–Cas systems by investigating off-target effects and optimizing guide RNA design.
- Advancing genome engineering tools through structural studies that revealed RNA-mediated conformational activation of Cas9, thereby informing the rational design of improved CRISPR-based technologies.

== Media coverage ==
Sternberg has been featured in various news outlets and interviews discussing the scientific potential and ethical implications of CRISPR technology. For example, his work and viewpoints have been covered in The New York Times, which highlighted the promise and challenges of genome editing. He has also delivered a TEDMED talk on CRISPR's impact on human health and ethics. In addition, his insights on genome engineering have been featured on podcasts such as DNA Today.

== Awards and honors ==
Sternberg has received several awards that recognize his contributions to genome engineering and CRISPR research, including:

- Howard Hughes Medical Institute Investigator
- NIH Director's New Innovator Award
- Alfred P. Sloan Research Fellowship in Chemistry
- Pew Biomedical Scholar
- Additionally, he has been recognized as a Schaefer Research Scholar and has received other accolades throughout his career.

== Selected publications ==
- O’Connell, M.R., Oakes, B.L., Sternberg, S.H., East-Seletsky, A., Kaplan, M., Doudna, J.A. “Programmable RNA recognition and cleavage by CRISPR/Cas9.” Nature 516 (2014): 263–266.
- Sternberg, S.H., LaFrance, B., Kaplan, M., Doudna, J.A. “Conformational control of DNA target cleavage by CRISPR-Cas9.” Nature 527 (2015): 110–113.
- Sternberg, S.H., et al. “DNA interrogation by the CRISPR RNA-guided endonuclease Cas9.” Nature 507 (2014): 62–67.
