= Philippe Horvath =

French biologist

- Born: 17 April 1970 (age 56)
- Education: Université Louis Pasteur, Strasbourg
- Occupation: Scientist
- Employer(s): DuPont Nutrition and Health

Philippe Horvath is a French scientist working for DuPont Nutrition and Health. His work was integral to the development of CRISPR-Cas, a versatile biochemical method for targeted genetic engineering. For this work, he was awarded the 2015 Massry Prize along with Emmanuelle Charpentier and Jennifer Doudna, as well as the 2016 Canada Gairdner International Award, with his Massry co-laureates in addition to Feng Zhang, Rodolphe Barrangou, Anthony Fauci, and Frank Plummer.

== Career ==
Born in Colmar, as the family name Horvath indicates, he is of Hungarian ancestry. After attending school in Colmar, Horvath studied cellular and molecular biology at the Université Louis Pasteur, Strasbourg, where he obtained a Master's in 1996 and a Ph.D. in 2000. After graduation, he went to the Department of Research and Development of Rhodia Food (formerly Rhône-Poulenc) in Dangé-Saint-Romain, where he worked to develop molecular biology techniques for bacterial strain screening, microbial identification, and typing of lactic acid bacteria and their phages. In 2004, Rhodia Food was acquired by Danisco, and Philippe was promoted to senior scientist in 2006. The division was later purchased by DuPont in 2011, and Horvath was appointed an Associate to the DuPort Fellows Forum in 2014, and a DuPont Nutrition & Health Technical Fellow in 2015.

== Research ==
Since late 2002, Philippe's research activities have centered around CRISPR (clustered regularly interspaced short palindromic repeats). Early work was stimulated by with the aim of improving the durability of bacterial starter cultures to improve the manufacture of cheese and ice cream, particularly efforts to address bacteriophages---viruses that infect bacteria. Horvath explored sections in the bacterial genome with clustered regularly interspaced short palindromic repeats, both for their utility in differentiating between strains, and because of their role in the bacterial immune system. As this prokaryotic viral defense mechanism was understood, it was recognized that CRISPRs could be used with specific endonuclease enzymes for genome editing and gene regulation. As of 2016, Philippe has been the co-inventor of 95 patents and/or applications, and co-author of 31 peer-reviewed research articles.
