= Lonvoguran ziclumeran =

Lonvoguran ziclumeran (also known as lonvo-z) is an investigational gene therapy being developed to treat hereditary angioedema. It is a CRISPR-based gene therapy, and, if approved by the FDA, it would be the first example of an approved, in vivo, CRISPR-based gene therapy. The drug is being developed by Intellia Therapeutics and was initially known by the investigational drug name NTLA-2002.
