= Bonnie Ramsey =

American pediatric pulmonologist and cystic fibrosis researcher

Bonnie W. Ramsey is an American pediatric pulmonologist and researcher. She is a professor emerita of pediatrics at the University of Washington School of Medicine and has held the Bonnie W. Ramsey, M.D. Endowed Chair in Cystic Fibrosis. She served as director of the Center for Clinical and Translational Research at Seattle Children’s Research Institute from 2007 to 2021. Her research has focused on developing new therapies for cystic fibrosis, including clinical trials supporting the first CFTR modulator therapy, ivacaftor (Kalydeco).

== Education ==
Ramsey received a B.A. from Stanford University in 1972 and an M.D. from Harvard Medical School in 1976. She completed pediatric residency training at Boston Children’s Hospital and training at Seattle Children’s Hospital.

== Career ==
Ramsey’s academic career was based at the University of Washington School of Medicine, where she served as a professor (and later professor emerita) of pediatrics and vice chair for research in the Department of Pediatrics. In 2005, the Bonnie W. Ramsey, M.D. Professorship in Cystic Fibrosis was upgraded to an endowed chair, with Ramsey named as its first holder.

She helped establish the Cystic Fibrosis Foundation’s Therapeutics Development Network (TDN) and led the network from 1998 to 2015, supporting multicenter clinical trials for cystic fibrosis therapies.

Ramsey participated in the design and oversight of clinical trials supporting the development and U.S. Food and Drug Administration approval of ivacaftor, the first CFTR modulator therapy, in 2012.

Ramsey retired from full-time faculty work in 2022 and has continued in advisory roles, including as a senior advisor to the Cystic Fibrosis Foundation Therapeutics Development Network.

== Awards and honors ==
In 2014, Ramsey was awarded the American Thoracic Society Distinguished Achievement Award.

Ramsey was elected to the National Academy of Medicine in 2015.

In 2018, she was a recipient of the Warren Alpert Foundation Prize.

In 2025, Ramsey received the John Howland Award from the American Pediatric Society.
