= Fred Grieman =

American experimental chemist

Frederick J. Grieman is an American experimental physical chemist. He is the Roscoe Moss Professor of Chemistry at Pomona College in Claremont, California. His research interests include chemical reactions in the atmosphere that affect the concentrations of pollutants and gas-phase spectroscopy of transition metal compounds.

== Early life and education ==
Grieman attended the University of California, Irvine. He then earned his doctorate from the University of California, Berkeley.

== Career ==
Grieman came to Pomona College in 1982. He was the associate dean of the college from 1997 to 2000.
