= Gordon J. Freeman =

American scientist

Gordon J. Freeman is an American immunologist and oncologist at the Dana-Farber Cancer Institute and Harvard Medical School.

== Education ==
As a high-school student in the Fort Worth, Texas, area, Freeman was recognized as a finalist in the 1969 Westinghouse Science Talent Search. He earned a bachelor's degree in biochemistry and molecular biology from Harvard University. In 1979, he earned a Ph.D. there and then worked as a postdoctoral fellow with Harvey Cantor and Lee Nadler at the Dana-Farber Cancer Institute (DFCI).

== Career and research interests ==
As of 2016, he leads a working group at the DFCI and is a professor of internal medicine at Harvard Medical School.

Freeman is concerned with stimulatory and inhibitory signals in the process of the immune response . He was able to significantly clarify the importance of B7-1, B7-2 and other members of the B7 gene family as well as of CD28 and CTLA-4 in T cell activation and of PD-L1 / PD-1 (programmed cell death protein 1) contribute to the inhibition of T cell activation.

== Recognition ==
In 2014, Freeman received the William B. Coley Award along with Tasuku Honjo, Lieping Chen and Arlene Sharpe.

In 2017, Freeman was one of the winners of the Warren Alpert Foundation Prize, and in 2022 he was elected to the American Academy of Arts and Sciences and the National Academy of Sciences.
