= Lieping Chen =

Chinese American immunologist (born 1960)

Lieping Chen (Chinese: 陳列平; born 1960) is a Chinese-American immunologist and physician-scientist.

== Life and career ==
Chen was born in Fuzhou, and graduated with a medical degree from Fujian Medical College in 1982, a master's of science degree in immunology from Peking Union Medical College in 1986, and a doctorate in pathology and laboratory medicine from Drexel University in 1989. After completing postdoctoral research at the University of Washington, Chen was a research scientist at Bristol Myers Squibb until 1997. Subsequently, Chen worked for the Mayo Clinic. Chen began his teaching career at the Johns Hopkins University School of Medicine in 2004, and joined the Yale University School of Medicine in 2010. At Yale, Chen holds the United Technologies Corporation Professorship in Cancer Research.

Chen's research has led to the establishment of several companies, including the Amplimmune Biotechnology Company (which was acquired by MedImmune in 2013), NextCure, and Normunity. Since 2018, Chen has been a member of the scientific advisory board of Zai Laboratory.

In 2014, Chen shared the William B. Coley Award for Distinguished Research in Tumor Immunology. In 2017, he was a joint recipient of the Warren Alpert Foundation Prize. The following year, Chen was named a Giant of Cancer Care and elected a member of Taiwan's Academia Sinica. In 2021, he was elected a fellow of the American Association for Cancer Research as well as the United States National Academy of Sciences. In 2022, Chen was elected to the Connecticut Academy of Science and Engineering.
