= Rodolphe Barrangou =

French American probiotics researcher

- Education: Paris Descartes University; University of Technology of Compiegne; North Carolina State University; University of Wisconsin – Madison
- Scientific career
- Workplaces: DuPont; North Carolina State University

Rodolphe Barrangou is the Todd R. Klaenhammer Distinguished Professor in Probiotics Research in the Department of Food, Bioprocessing and Nutrition Sciences at North Carolina State University; Co-Founder and Chief Executive Officer of CRISPR Biotechnologies; Co-Founder and Chief Scientific Officer of Ancilia Biosciences; Co-Founder, President and Chief Scientific Officer of TreeCo; and Co-Founder and member of the Scientific Advisory Board of Intellia Therapeutics. His research focuses on CRISPR-Cas9 in bacteria.

In 2017, Barrangou was named Editor-in-Chief of The CRISPR Journal, a peer-reviewed journal covering the field of genome editing and CRISPR research, which debuted in February 2018.

He was elected as a member into the National Academy of Sciences in 2018. He was also elected into the National Academy of Engineering in 2019 for the discovery of CRISPR-Cas genome editing and engineering microbes, plants, and animals for food and other applications.

== Background ==
Dr Barrangou's research has been funded by the National Institutes of Health, National Science Foundation, US Department of Agriculture, and institutional grants. He previously worked as an adjunct professor of Food Science at Pennsylvania State University, and R&D Director of Genomics at DuPont.

In 2007, Barrangou was the first author on a paper published in Science providing experimental proof for the immune function of CRISPR. He has worked with Jennifer Doudna on Cas9 guided RNA characterization. He has been awarded 17 patents as of 2016.

== Education ==
- B.S. (1996) Paris Descartes University
- M.S. (2000) University of Technology of Compiegne in Biological Engineering
- M.S. (2000) North Carolina State University in Food Science
- Ph.D. (2004) North Carolina State University in Functional Genomics
- Executive MBA (2011) University of Wisconsin–Madison

== Awards ==
- 2018 NAS Prize in Food and Agriculture Sciences
- 2017 NAS Award in Molecular Biology
- 2016 Canada Gairdner International Award
- 2016 Warren Alpert Foundation Prize
- 2015 Thomson Reuters Highly Cited Researcher (I-2878-2014)
- 2015 NC State University Faculty Scholar
- 2014 NC State Alumni Association Outstanding Research Award recipient
- 2014 Inducted into Phi Tau Sigma, the Honor Society for Food Science
- 2011 NC State Food Science Outstanding Young Alumni award recipient
- 2008 Danisco Innovation Award Recipient
- 2003 National Science Foundation IGERT Fellow
