= Rachel Haurwitz =

American biochemist (born 1985)

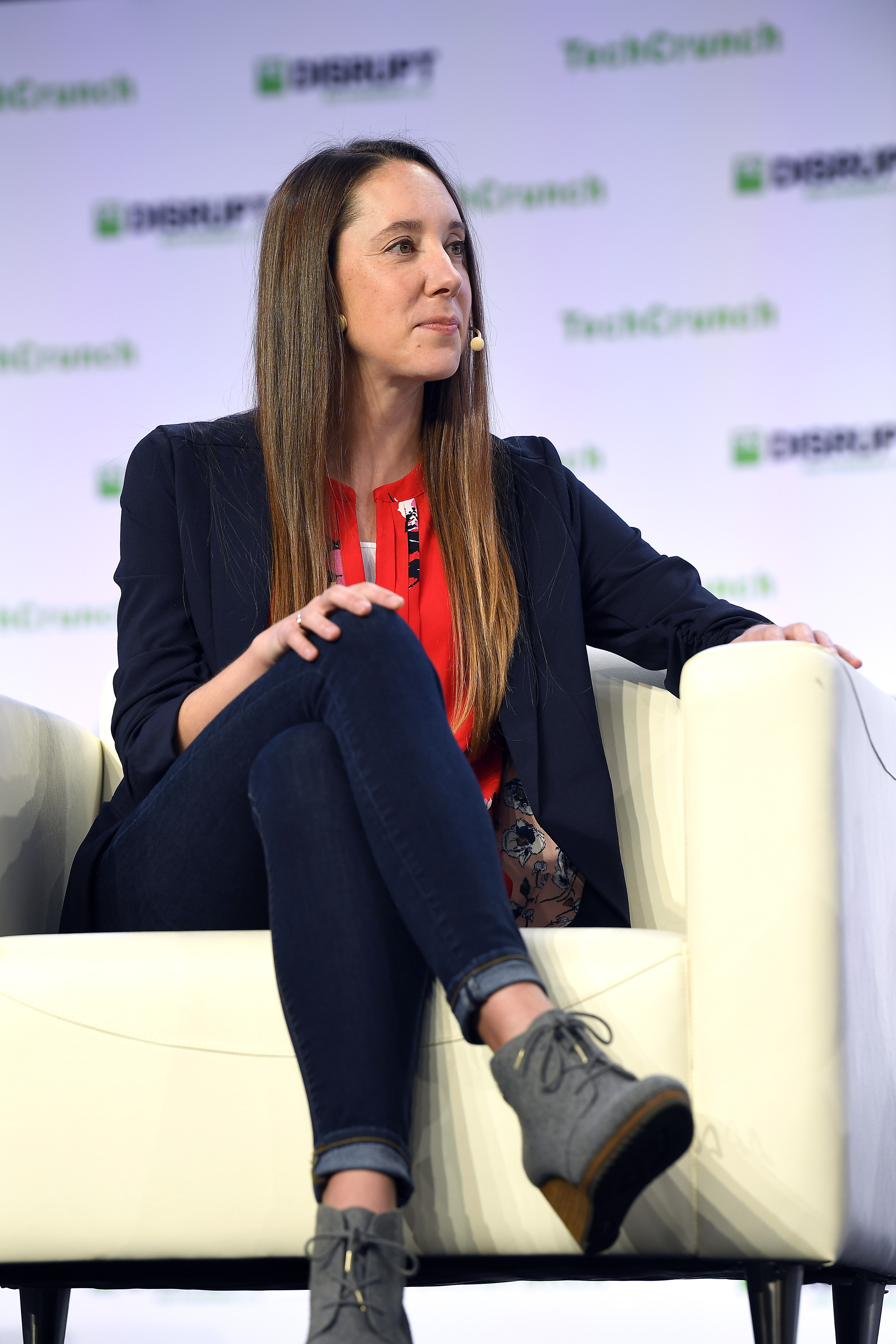
- Haurwitz in 2019
- Born: Rachel Elizabeth Haurwitz; May 20, 1985 (age 41); Austin, Texas, U.S.
- Education: Harvard College (B.A.); University of California, Berkeley (Ph.D.)
- Known for: Co-founding Caribou Biosciences
- Scientific career
- Fields: Biochemistry
- Workplaces: Caribou Biosciences
- Thesis: The CRISPR endoribonuclease Csy4 utilizes unusual sequence- and structure-specific mechanisms to recognize and process crRNAs (2012)
- Doctoral advisor: Jennifer Doudna

Rachel Elizabeth Haurwitz (born May 20, 1985) is an American biochemist and structural biologist. She is the co-founder, chief executive officer, and president of Caribou Biosciences, a genome editing company.

== Early life and education ==
Haurwitz was born on May 20, 1985. She grew up in Austin, Texas. Her mother is an elementary school teacher and her father, an environmental journalist.

Haurwitz began researching RNA during her undergraduate years. She attended Harvard College where she earned an undergraduate degree. In 2007, she began doctoral studies at University of California, Berkeley. At the age of 21, Haurwitz began working as a graduate student in Jennifer Doudna's laboratory, in 2008 where she completed her doctorate in molecular and cell biology. Haurwitz originally intended on becoming an intellectual property lawyer for biotechnology patents but later chose to continue in science.

== Career ==
In 2011, Haurwitz and Doudna co-founded Caribou Biosciences, a gene editing spinout-startup company. Haurwitz is the company's CEO and president. She holds several patents for CRISPR-based technologies. The firm was initially housed in the basement of the building that housed Doudna's laboratory. The company supports the commercialization of CRISPR technology in healthcare and agriculture. Its researchers explore issues in antimicrobial resistance, food scarcity, and vaccine shortages. The company licensed Berkeley's CRISPR patent and deals with agricultural and pharmaceutical companies and research firms. In 2018, Haurwitz announced that the firm was shifting focus on medicine and developing cancer therapies targeting microbes.

In July 2021, Caribou Biosciences became a public company through an initial public offering on the Nasdaq that raised $304 million in gross proceeds. Under Haurwitz's leadership, the company advanced CB-010, an allogeneic anti-CD19 CAR-T cell therapy, through the ANTLER Phase 1 clinical trial in relapsed or refractory B cell non-Hodgkin lymphoma.

In 2024 and 2025, Caribou carried out two rounds of restructuring. In April 2025, the company reduced its workforce by 32 percent and discontinued clinical trials in lupus and acute myeloid leukemia as well as its preclinical research, in order to concentrate on its two lead oncology programs. In November 2025, the company reported positive Phase 1 data for the therapy, by then named vispa-cel, showing efficacy comparable to approved autologous CAR-T cell therapies.

In October 2026, Haurwitz announced Caribou Biosciences is shutting down operations due to an inability "to secure the capital required to responsibly advance" its allogeneic CAR-T cell therapies.

== Personal life ==
She is a long-distance runner and is training for a marathon. Haurwitz knits as a hobby.

== Recognition ==
In 2021, Haurwitz was selected as a Bloomberg New Economy Catalyst. As part of the program, she attended the annual New Economy Forum held in Singapore, and the Bloomberg New Economy Catalyst Retreat that same year. Haurwitz was named to Fortune's 40 Under 40 list in 2016 and MIT Technology Review's Innovators Under 35 in 2017.

== Selected works ==
=== Papers ===
- Haurwitz, Rachel E.; Jinek, Martin; Wiedenheft, Blake; Zhou, Kaihong; Doudna, Jennifer A. (September 10, 2010). "Sequence- and Structure-Specific RNA Processing by a CRISPR Endonuclease". Science. 329 (5997): 1355–1358. Bibcode:2010Sci...329.1355H. doi:10.1126/science.1192272. PMC 3133607. PMID 20829488.
- Qi, Lei; Haurwitz, Rachel E; Shao, Wenjun; Doudna, Jennifer A; Arkin, Adam P (September 16, 2012). "RNA processing enables predictable programming of gene expression". Nature Biotechnology. 30 (10): 1002–1006. doi:10.1038/nbt.2355. PMID 22983090. S2CID 1333889.
