= Yoshizumi Ishino =

Japanese molecular biologist (born 1959)

- 石野 良純
- Born: 1957 (age 68–69); Kyoto Prefecture, Japan
- Education: Osaka University
- Known for: CRISPR
- Awards: AMED Award (2017)
- Scientific career
- Fields: Molecular biology Biotechnology
- Workplaces: Kyushu University; University of Illinois at Urbana–Champaign

Yoshizumi Ishino (石野 良純, Ishino Yoshizumi) is a Japanese molecular biologist, known for discovering the DNA sequence of Clustered Regularly Interspaced Short Palindromic Repeats (CRISPR).

== Biography ==
Ishino was born in Kyoto Prefecture, Japan. He received his BS, MS and PhD in 1981, 1983 and 1986 from Osaka University. From 1987 to 1989, he served as a post-doctoral fellow in Dieter Söll's laboratory at Yale University.

In 2002, he became a professor at Kyushu University. Since October 2013, he has been a member of the NASA Astrobiology Institute, University of Illinois at Urbana–Champaign.

After completing his PhD, Ishino became senior research scientist at the Bioproducts Development Center of Takara Shuzo. Later in life, he joined BERI (Biomolecular Engineering Research Institute), in which he conducted research on nucleic acids-related enzymes.

== Research contribution ==
Ishino has contributed to the development of enzymology and nucleic acids research in his life. The "iap" gene in gut microbe E. coli was sequenced by Ishino and his colleagues in 1987. As the DNA segment used was longer than the gene itself, they accidentally discovered a partial DNA sequence of then-unnamed CRISPR in the process, which would eventually become the basis of CRISPR gene editing. Ishino was one of the first scientists to have detected CRISPRs in E. coli. In 1990, Ishino began researching DNA replication of micro-organisms in the Archaea domain.

== Recognition ==
- 2017 - AMED Award, Japan Agency for Medical Research and Development (AMED)
- 2018 - JSBBA Award, Japan Society for Bioscience, Biotechnology and Agrochemistry (JSBBA)
- 2022 - Kihara Award, The Genetics Society of Japan
