= Virginijus Šikšnys =

Lithuanian biochemist

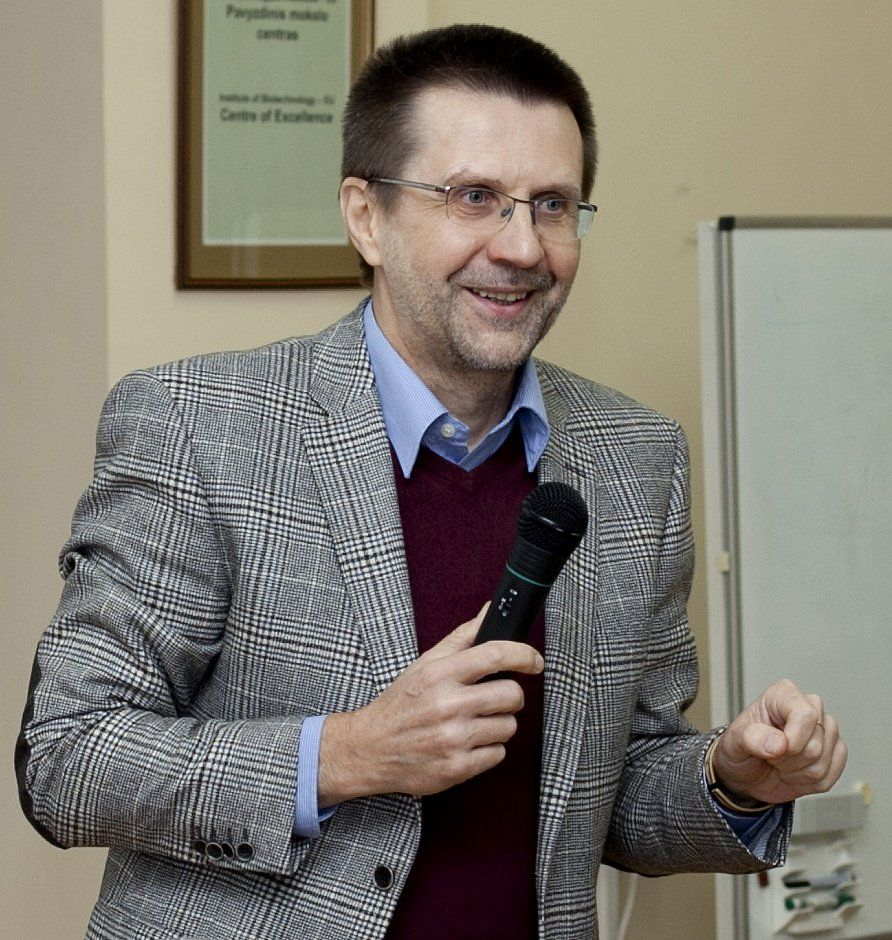
- Born: 26 January 1956 (age 70)
- Education: Vilnius University (BSc); Lomonosov Moscow State University (PhD)
- Known for: CRISPR; Restriction endonucleases
- Awards: Lithuanian Science Prize (2001); St. Christopher award for the merits in science from the Vilnius City Council (2015); Novozymes Prize (2017); Kavli Prize in Nanoscience (2018); Baltic Assembly Prize for Science (2021)
- Scientific career
- Fields: Biochemistry
- Workplaces: Vilnius University Institute of Biotechnology; Lithuanian Academy of Sciences

Virginijus Šikšnys (born 26 January 1956) is a Lithuanian biochemist and a professor at Vilnius University. He is a chief scientist at the Vilnius University Institute of Biotechnology.

== Biography ==
Šikšnys studied organic chemistry at Vilnius University, receiving his Bachelor's degree in 1978. He then moved to Lomonosov Moscow State University, where he studied enzyme kinetics and received the Candidate of Sciences degree (equivalent to PhD at that time) in 1983. His PhD advisor was Karel Martinek from, at that time, Czechoslovakia.

From 1982 till 1993 he worked at the Institute of Applied Enzymology in Vilnius. In 1993 he was a visiting scientist in Robert Huber's laboratory at the Max-Planck-Institut für Biochemie, Martinsried, Germany. Since 1995 Šikšnys is the chief scientist and head of the Department of Protein-DNA Interactions at the Vilnius University Institute of Biotechnology, since 2006 – professor at Vilnius University and a member of the Lithuanian Academy of Sciences, since 2007 – chair of the Institute of Biotechnology Council.

In 2017, Šikšnys co-founded a gene-editing company "Caszyme".

== Research ==
The research interests of Šikšnys include structure-function relationships of enzymes involved in nucleic acids metabolism. Šikšnys and members of his laboratory perform biochemical, biophysical and structural studies of proteins involved in bacterial antiviral defense, including restriction endonucleases and CRISPR-Cas systems. Šikšnys has co-authored more than 90 scientific publications and filled 5 patent applications. For more than two decades Šikšnys' lab was focused on restriction endonucleases. Together with colleagues from UK, Poland, Germany and other countries, Šikšnys has performed biochemical studies of more than 20 restriction endonucleases, and solved approximately one third (~15 out of ~50) of currently available restriction endonuclease tertiary structures, some of them in collaboration with the Nobel Prize laureate Robert Huber.

=== Publication of CRISPR-Cas ===
Since 2007 Šikšnys focused on mechanistic studies of CRISPR-Cas, the newly discovered bacterial antiviral systems, and was among the first to demonstrate programmable DNA cleavage by the Cas9 protein. According to Šikšnys, his article was not even considered as serious by the editor board of the academic journal and was not sent to the reviewers, therefore the time needed to be recognized as first was lost. Martin Schlak reported that Šikšnys submitted his article describing DNA cleavage by Cas9 to Cell Reports on 18 April 2012. After its rejection without peer review, he sent it to PNAS one month later, and it took several months for review and publication. In the meantime, Jennifer Doudna and Emmanuelle Charpentier had published their findings in Science where their findings were reviewed and accepted within two weeks.

The genome editing technology based on Cas9 was licensed to DuPont.

== Honours and awards ==
- 2001 Lithuanian Science Prize (together with Saulius Klimašauskas)
- 2004–2005 Lithuanian State Scholarship
- 2012 Vilnius University Rector's award
- 2015 St. Christopher award for the merits in science from the Vilnius City Council
- 2016 Warren Alpert Foundation Prize
- 2016 EMBO associate membership
- 2017 Lithuanian Science Prize
- 2018 Kavli Prize in Nanoscience
- 2021 Baltic Assembly Prize for Science
