= Emmanuelle Charpentier =

French microbiologist, biochemist and Nobel laureate (born 1968)

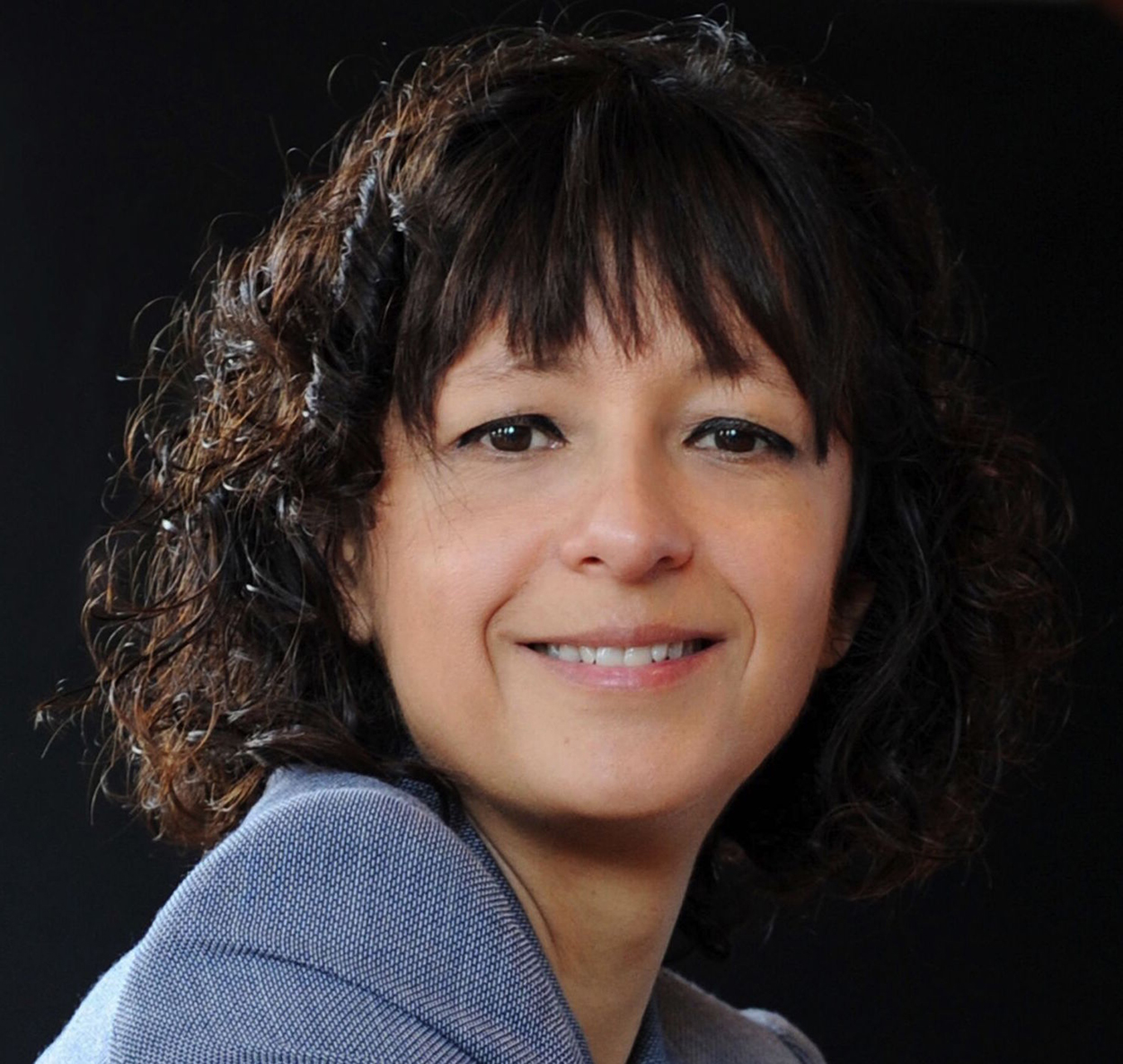
- Charpentier in 2015
- Born: Emmanuelle Marie Charpentier; 11 December 1968 (age 57); Juvisy-sur-Orge, France
- Education: Pierre and Marie Curie University (BSc, MSc, PhD)
- Known for: CRISPR
- Awards: Louis-Jeantet Prize for Medicine (2015); Breakthrough Prize in Life Sciences (2015); Princess of Asturias Award (2015); Tang Prize in Biopharmaceutical Science (2016); Canada Gairdner International Award (2016); Leibniz Prize (2016); Pour le Mérite (2017); Japan Prize (2017); The Novozymes Prize (2017); Kavli Prize in Nanoscience (2018); Wolf Prize in Medicine (2020); Nobel Prize in Chemistry (2020); National Inventors Hall of Fame (2023)
- Scientific career
- Fields: Microbiology; Genetics; Biochemistry
- Workplaces: University of Berlin; University of Vienna; Umeå University; Max Planck Society
- Thesis: Antibiotic resistance in Listeria spp (1995)
- Doctoral advisor: Patrice Courvalin
- Website: www.emmanuelle-charpentier-pr.org

Emmanuelle Marie Charpentier (French pronunciation: [emanɥɛl maʁi ʃaʁpɑ̃tje]; born 11 December 1968) is a French academic, microbiologist, geneticist, and biochemist. She has served as a director at the Max Planck Institute for Infection Biology in Berlin since 2015. Three years later, she founded an independent research institute, the Max Planck Unit for the Science of Pathogens. In 2020, Charpentier and American biochemist Jennifer Doudna of the University of California, Berkeley, were awarded the Nobel Prize in Chemistry "for the development of a method for genome editing" (through CRISPR). This was the first science Nobel Prize ever won exclusively by two women.

== Early life and education ==
Charpentier's paternal grandfather, surnamed Sinanian, was an Armenian who escaped to France during the Armenian Genocide and met his wife in Marseille. Charpentier was born in 1968 in Juvisy-sur-Orge in France and studied biochemistry, microbiology, and genetics at the Pierre and Marie Curie University (which became the Faculty of Science of Sorbonne University) in Paris. She was a graduate student at the Institut Pasteur from 1992 to 1995 and was awarded a research doctorate. Charpentier's PhD work investigated molecular mechanisms involved in antibiotic resistance.

== Career and research ==
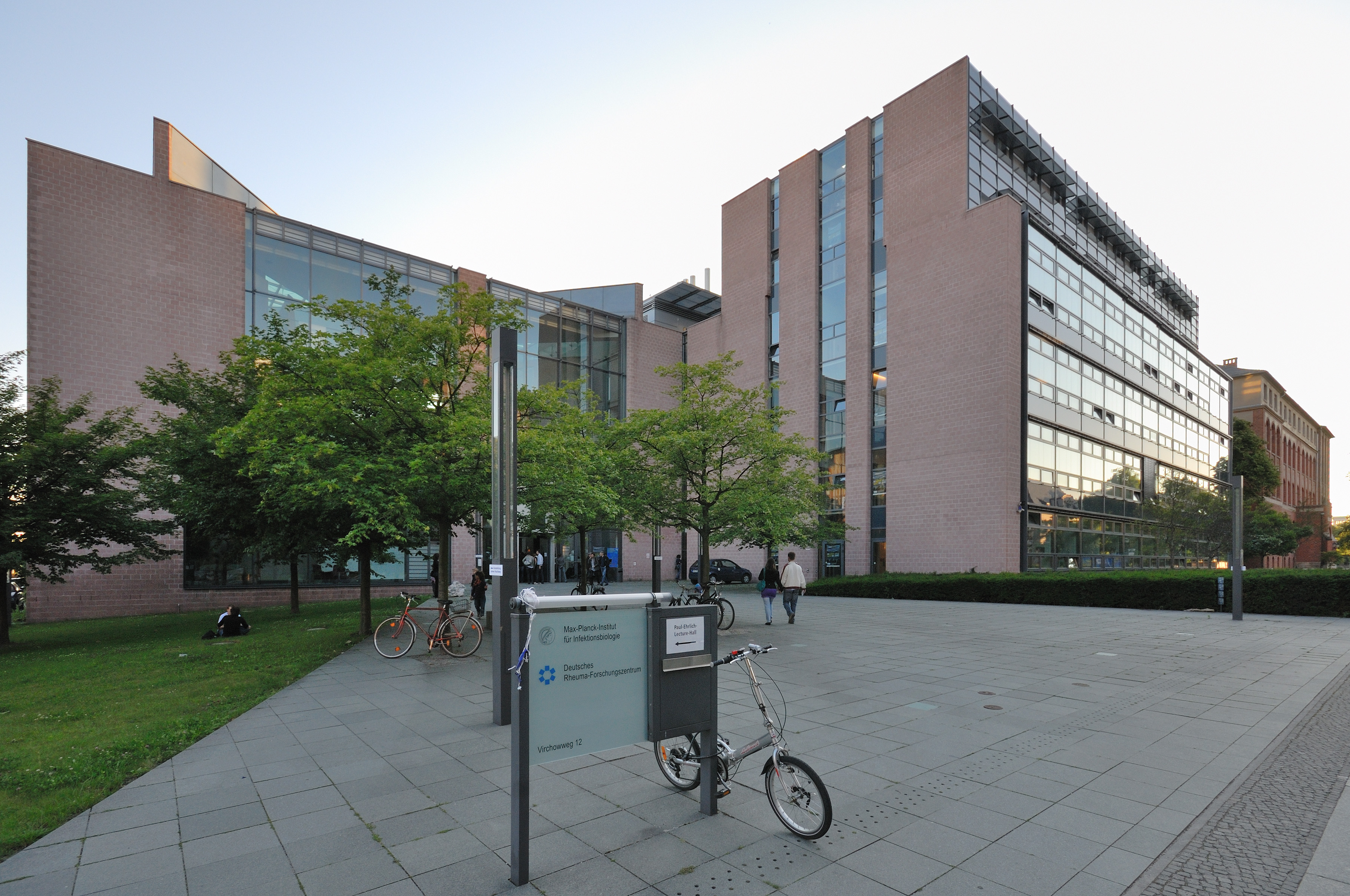
The Max Planck Institute for Infection Biology in Berlin, Germany

Charpentier worked as a university teaching assistant at Pierre and Marie Curie University from 1993 to 1995 and as a postdoctoral fellow at the Institut Pasteur from 1995 to 1996. She moved to the US and worked as a postdoctoral fellow at Rockefeller University in New York from 1996 to 1997. During this time, Charpentier worked in the lab of microbiologist Elaine Tuomanen. Tuomanen's lab investigated how the pathogen Streptococcus pneumoniae utilizes mobile genetic elements to alter its genome. Charpentier also helped to demonstrate how S. pneumoniae develops vancomycin resistance.

Charpentier was an assistant research scientist at the New York University Medical Center from 1997 to 1999. She worked in the lab of Pamela Cowin, a skin-cell biologist interested in mammalian gene manipulation. Charpentier published a paper exploring the regulation of hair growth in mice. She held the position of Research Associate at the St. Jude Children's Research Hospital and at the Skirball Institute of Biomolecular Medicine in New York from 1999 to 2002.

After five years in the United States, Charpentier returned to Europe and became the lab head and a guest professor at the Institute of Microbiology and Genetics, University of Vienna, from 2002 to 2004. In 2004, Charpentier published her discovery of an RNA molecule involved in the regulation of virulence-factor synthesis in Streptococcus pyogenes. From 2004 to 2006, she was lab head and an assistant professor at the Department of Microbiology and Immunobiology. In 2006, she became a privatdozentin (Microbiology) and received her habilitation at the Centre of Molecular Biology. From 2006 to 2009 she worked as lab head and associate professor at the Max F. Perutz Laboratories.

Charpentier moved to Sweden and became lab head and associate professor at the Laboratory for Molecular Infection Medicine Sweden (MIMS), at Umeå University. She held the position of group leader from 2008 to 2013 and was visiting professor from 2014 to 2017. She moved to Germany to act as department head and W3 Professor at the Helmholtz Centre for Infection Research in Braunschweig and the Hannover Medical School from 2013 until 2015. In 2014, she became an Alexander von Humboldt Professor.

In 2015, Charpentier accepted an offer from the German Max Planck Society to become a scientific member of the society and a director at the Max Planck Institute for Infection Biology in Berlin. Since 2016, she has been an Honorary Professor at Humboldt University in Berlin. Charpentier retained her position as visiting professor at Umeå University until the end of 2017 when a new donation from the Kempe Foundations and the Knut and Alice Wallenberg Foundation allowed her to offer more young researchers positions within research groups of the MIMS Laboratory. In 2018, she became the founding and acting director of the Max Planck Unit for the Science of Pathogens.

== CRISPR/Cas9 ==
Charpentier is best known for her Nobel-winning work of deciphering the molecular mechanisms of a bacterial immune system, called CRISPR/Cas9, and repurposing it into a tool for genome editing. In particular, she uncovered a novel mechanism for the maturation of a non-coding RNA which is pivotal in the function of CRISPR/Cas9, demonstrating that a small RNA called tracrRNA is essential for the maturation of crRNA.

In 2011, Charpentier met Jennifer Doudna at a research conference in San Juan, Puerto Rico, and they began a collaboration. Working with Doudna's laboratory, Charpentier's laboratory showed that Cas9 could be used to make cuts in any DNA sequence desired. The method they developed involved the combination of Cas9 with easily created synthetic "guide RNA" molecules. Synthetic guide RNA is a chimera of crRNA and tracrRNA; therefore, this discovery demonstrated that the CRISPR-Cas9 technology could be used to edit the genome with relative ease. Researchers worldwide have employed this method successfully to edit the DNA sequences of plants, animals, and laboratory cell lines. Since its discovery, CRISPR has revolutionized genetics by allowing scientists to edit genes to probe their role in health and disease and to develop genetic therapies with the hope that it will prove safer and more effective than the first generation of gene therapies.

In 2013, Charpentier co-founded CRISPR Therapeutics and ERS Genomics along with Shaun Foy and Rodger Novak.

== Awards ==
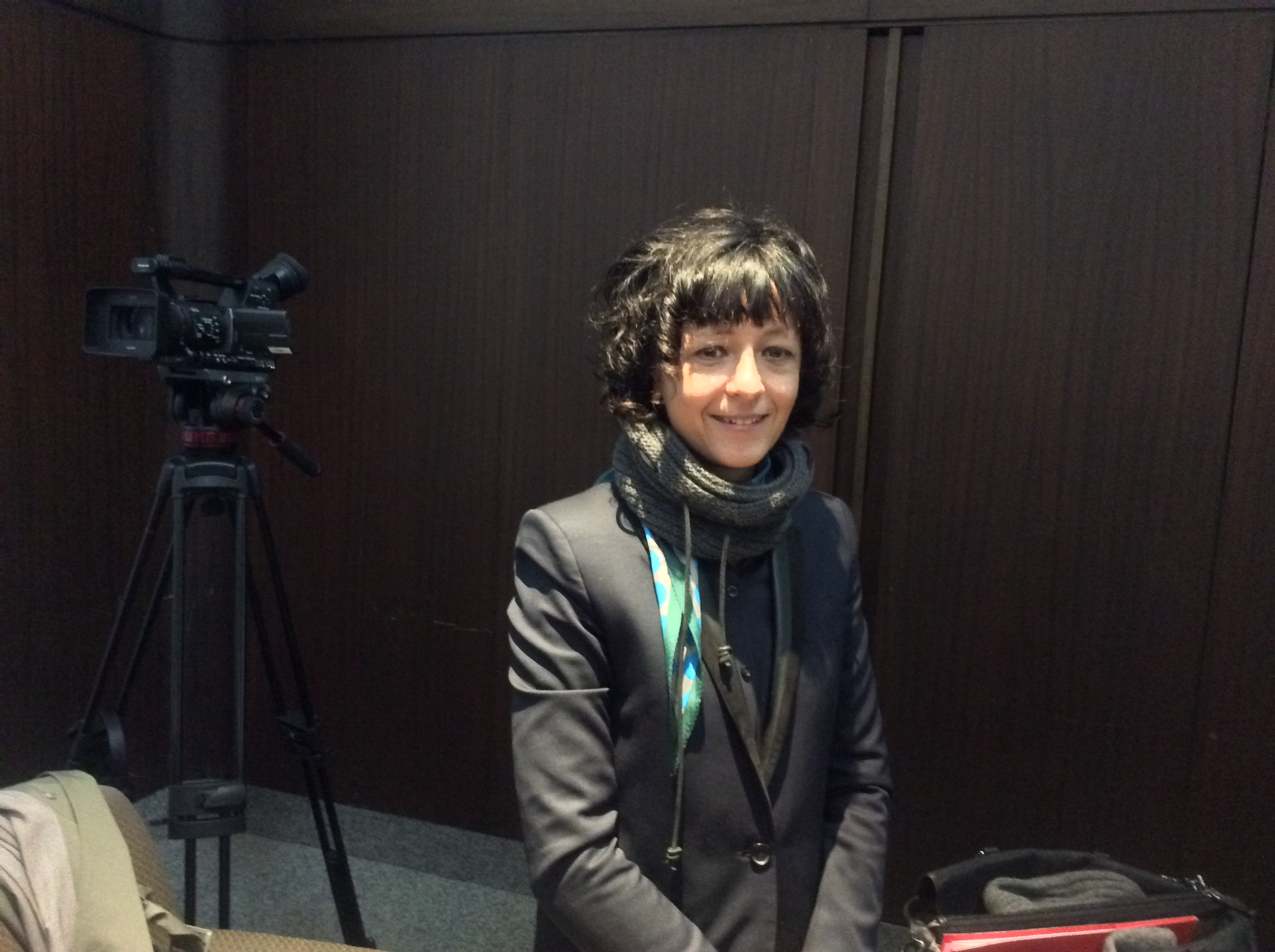
Emmanuelle Charpentier in the Senate Chamber of York University in 2016, after giving her Gairdner Foundation International Award Lecture

In 2015, Time magazine designated Charpentier one of the Time 100 most influential people in the world (together with Jennifer Doudna).

Charpentier's awards are:

Nobel Prize in Chemistry, the Breakthrough Prize in Life Sciences, the Louis-Jeantet Prize for Medicine, the Gruber Foundation International Prize in Genetics, the Leibniz Prize, the Tang Prize, the Japan Prize, and the Kavli Prize in Nanoscience. She has won the BBVA Foundation Frontiers of Knowledge Award jointly with Jennifer Doudna and Francisco Mojica.

- 2009 – Theodor Körner Prize for Science and Culture
- 2011 – The Fernström Prize for young and promising scientists
- 2014 – Alexander von Humboldt Professorship
- 2014 – The Göran Gustafsson Prize for Molecular Biology (Royal Swedish Academy of Sciences)
- 2014 – Dr. Paul Janssen Award for Biomedical Research (shared with Jennifer Doudna)
- 2014 – The Jacob Heskel Gabbay Award (shared with Feng Zhang and Jennifer Doudna)
- 2015 – Time 100: Pioneers (shared with Jennifer Doudna)
- 2015 – The Breakthrough Prize in Life Sciences (shared with Jennifer Doudna)
- 2015 – Louis-Jeantet Prize for Medicine
- 2015 – The Ernst Jung Prize in Medicine
- 2015 – Princess of Asturias Awards (shared with Jennifer Doudna)
- 2015 – Gruber Foundation International Prize in Genetics (shared with Jennifer Doudna)
- 2015 – Carus Medal, from German National Academy of Science, Leopoldina
- 2015 – Massry Prize
- 2015 – Hansen Family Award
- 2016 – Otto Warburg Medal
- 2016 – L'Oréal-UNESCO "For Women in Science" Award
- 2016 – Leibniz Prize from the German Research Foundation
- 2016 – Canada Gairdner International Award (shared with Jennifer Doudna and Feng Zhang)
- 2016 – Warren Alpert Foundation Prize
- 2016 – Paul Ehrlich and Ludwig Darmstaedter Prize (jointly with Jennifer Doudna)
- 2016 – Tang Prize (shared with Jennifer Doudna and Feng Zhang)
- 2016 – HFSP Nakasone Award (jointly with Jennifer Doudna)
- 2016 – Knight (Chevalier) French National Order of the Legion of Honour
- 2016 – Meyenburg Prize
- 2016 – Wilhelm Exner Medal
- 2016 – John Scott Award
- 2017 – BBVA Foundation Frontiers of Knowledge Award (jointly with Jennifer Doudna and Francisco Mojica)
- 2017 – Japan Prize (jointly with Jennifer Doudna)
- 2017 – Albany Medical Center Prize (jointly with Jennifer Doudna, Luciano Marraffini, Francisco Mojica, and Feng Zhang)
- 2017 – Pour le Mérite
- 2018 – Kavli Prize in Nanoscience (jointly with Jennifer Doudna and Virginijus Šikšnys)
- 2018 – Austrian Decoration for Science and Art
- 2018 – Bijvoet Medal of the Bijvoet Center for Biomolecular Research of Utrecht University
- 2018 – Harvey Prize (jointly with Jennifer Doudna and Feng Zhang)
- 2019 – Scheele Award of the Swedish Pharmaceutical Society
- 2019 – Knight Commander's Cross of the Order of Merit of the Federal Republic of Germany
- 2020 – Wolf Prize in Medicine (jointly with Jennifer Doudna)
- 2020 – Nobel Prize in Chemistry (jointly with Jennifer Doudna)
- 2023 - National Inventors Hall of Fame (jointly with Jennifer Doudna)
- 2024 – Golden Plate Award of the American Academy of Achievement

=== Honorary doctorate degrees ===
- 2016 – École Polytechnique Fédérale de Lausanne
- 2016 – KU, (Catholic University) Leuven, Belgium
- 2016 – New York University (NYU)
- 2017 – Faculty of Medicine, Umeå University, Sweden
- 2017 – University of Western Ontario, London, Canada
- 2017 – Hong Kong University of Science and Technology
- 2018 – Université catholique de Louvain, Belgium
- 2018 – University of Cambridge
- 2018 – University of Manchester
- 2019 – McGill University, Canada
- 2024 – University of Saskatchewan, Canada
- 2024 – University of Perugia, Perugia, Italy
- 2026 – University of Ottawa, Ottawa, Canada

=== Memberships ===
- 2014 – European Molecular Biology Organisation
- 2015 – National Academy of Sciences Leopoldina
- 2016 – Berlin-Brandenburg Academy of Sciences
- 2016 – Austrian Academy of Sciences
- 2016 – Royal Swedish Academy of Sciences
- 2017 – U.S. National Academy of Sciences, Foreign Associate
- 2017 – National Academy of Technologies of France
- 2017 – French Académie des sciences
- 2018 – European Academy of Sciences and Arts
- 2021 – Pontifical Academy of Sciences
- 2024 – Foreign Member of the Royal Society

== In popular culture ==
In 2019, Charpentier was a featured character in the play STEM FEMMES by Philadelphia theater company Applied Mechanics.

In 2021, Walter Isaacson detailed the story of Jennifer Doudna and her collaboration with Charpentier leading to the discovery of CRISPR/CAS-9, in the biography The Code Breaker: Jennifer Doudna, Gene Editing, and the Future of the Human Race.
