= Designer baby =

Genetically modified human embryo

A designer baby is an embryo or fetus whose genetic makeup has been intentionally selected or altered, often to exclude a particular gene or to remove genes associated with disease, to achieve desired traits. This process usually involves preimplantation genetic diagnosis (PGD), which analyzes multiple human embryos to identify genes associated with specific diseases and characteristics, then selecting embryos that have the desired genetic makeup. While screening for single genes is commonly practiced, advancements in polygenic screening are becoming more prominent, though only a few companies currently offer it. This technique uses an algorithm to aggregate the estimated effects of numerous genetic variants tied to an individual's risk for a particular condition or trait. Other methods of altering a baby's genetic information involve directly editing the genome before birth, using technologies such as CRISPR. A controversial example of this can be seen in the 2018 case involving Chinese twins Lulu and Nana, which had their genomes edited to resist HIV infection, sparking widespread criticism and legal debates.

This highlights the implications of germline engineering, which involves introducing the desired genetic material into the embryo or parental germ cells. This process is typically prohibited by law, however, regulations vary globally. Editing embryos in this manner can result in genetic changes that are passed down to future generations, raising significant controversy and ethical concerns. While some scientists advocate for its use in treating genetic diseases, others warn that it could lead to misuse for non-medical purposes, such as cosmetic enhancements and modification of human traits.

== Pre-implantation genetic diagnosis ==
Pre-implantation genetic diagnosis (PGD or PIGD) is a procedure in which embryos are screened prior to implantation. The technique is used alongside in vitro fertilisation (IVF) to obtain embryos for evaluation of the genome – alternatively, oocytes can be screened prior to fertilisation. The technique was first used in 1989.

PGD is used primarily to select embryos for implantation in the case of possible genetic defects, allowing identification of mutated or disease-related alleles and selection against them. It is especially useful in embryos from parents where one or both carry a heritable disease. PGD can also be used to select for embryos of a certain sex, most commonly when a disease is more strongly associated with one sex than the other (as is the case for X-linked disorders which are more common in males, such as haemophilia). Infants born with traits selected following PGD are sometimes considered to be designer babies.

One application of PGD is the selection of 'saviour siblings', children who are born to provide a transplant (of an organ or group of cells) to a sibling with a usually life-threatening disease. Saviour siblings are conceived through IVF and then screened using PGD to analyze genetic similarity to the child needing a transplant, to reduce the risk of rejection.

=== Process ===
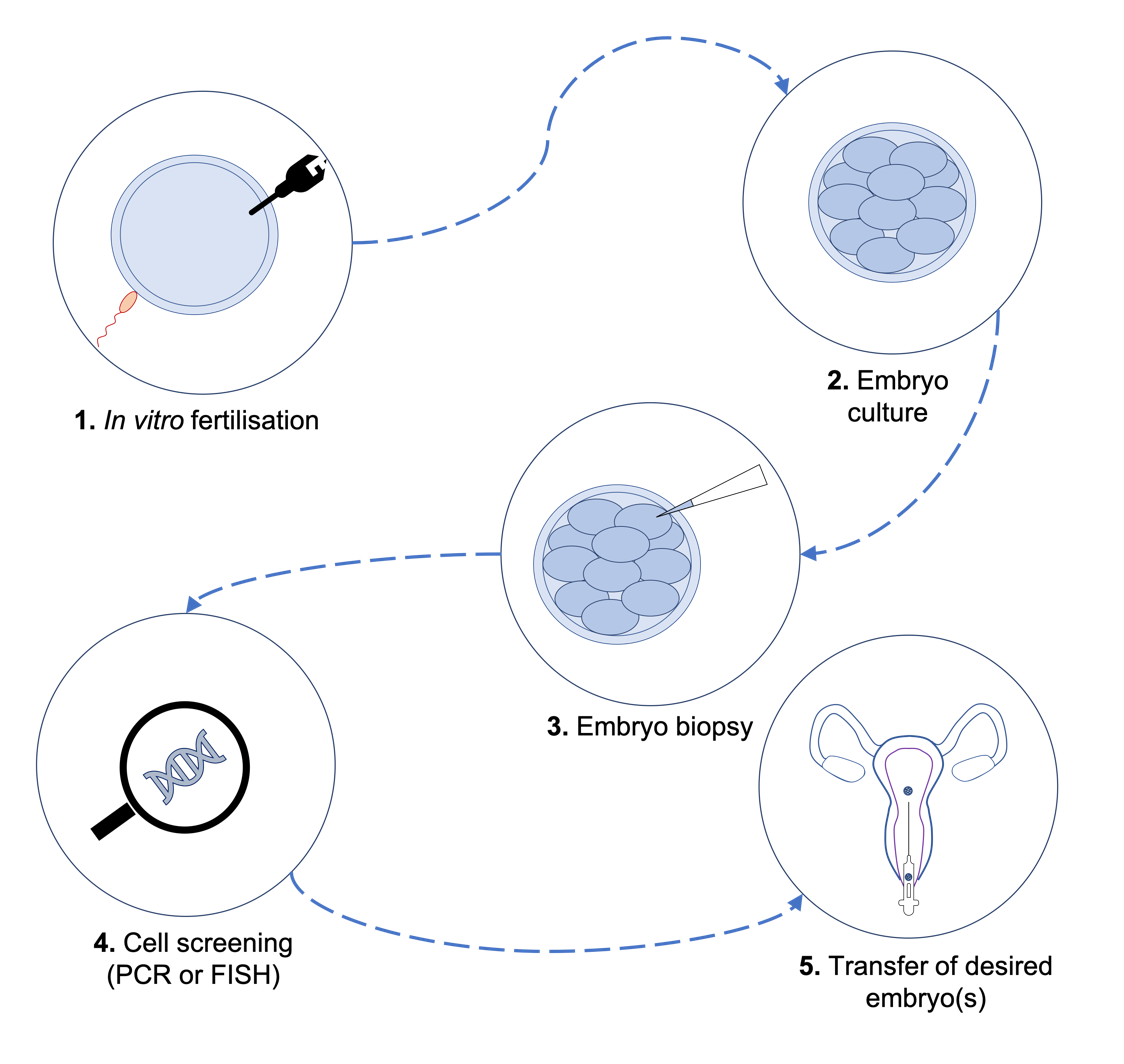
Process of pre-implantation genetic diagnosis. In vitro fertilisation involves either incubation of sperm and oocyte together, or injection of sperm directly into the oocyte. PCR - polymerase chain reaction, FISH - fluorescent in situ hybridisation.

Embryos for PGD are obtained from IVF procedures in which the oocyte is artificially fertilised by sperm. Oocytes from the woman are harvested following controlled ovarian hyperstimulation (COH), which involves fertility treatments to induce production of multiple oocytes. After harvesting the oocytes, they are fertilised in vitro, either during incubation with multiple sperm cells in culture, or via intracytoplasmic sperm injection (ICSI), where sperm is directly injected into the oocyte. The resulting embryos are usually cultured for 3–6 days, allowing them to reach the blastomere or blastocyst stage.

Once embryos reach the desired stage of development, cells are biopsied and genetically screened. The screening procedure varies based on the nature of the disorder being investigated.

Polymerase chain reaction (PCR) is a process in which DNA sequences are amplified to produce many more copies of the same segment, allowing screening of large samples and identification of specific genes. The process is often used when screening for monogenic disorders, such as cystic fibrosis.

Another screening technique, fluorescent in situ hybridisation (FISH) uses fluorescent probes which specifically bind to highly complementary sequences on chromosomes, which can then be identified using fluorescence microscopy. FISH is often used when screening for chromosomal abnormalities such as aneuploidy, making it a useful tool when screening for disorders such as Down syndrome.

Following the screening, embryos with the desired trait (or lacking an undesired trait such as a mutation) are transferred into the mother's uterus, then allowed to develop naturally.

=== Regulation ===
PGD regulation is determined by individual countries' governments, with some prohibiting its use entirely, including in Austria, China, and Ireland.

In many countries, PGD is permitted under very stringent conditions for medical use only, as is the case in France, Switzerland, Italy and the United Kingdom. Whilst PGD in Italy and Switzerland is only permitted under certain circumstances, there is no clear set of specifications under which PGD can be carried out, and selection of embryos based on sex is not permitted. In France and the UK, regulations are much more detailed, with dedicated agencies setting out framework for PGD. Selection based on sex is permitted under certain circumstances, and genetic disorders for which PGD is permitted are detailed by the countries' respective agencies.

In contrast, the United States federal law does not regulate PGD, with no dedicated agencies specifying regulatory framework by which healthcare professionals must abide. Elective sex selection is permitted, accounting for around 9% of all PGD cases in the U.S., as is selection for desired conditions such as deafness or dwarfism.

=== Polygenic risk score (PRS) screening ===
In the 2020s, companies such as Orchid Bioscience began offering polygenic risk scores (PRS) analysis for embryos during IVF. PRS estimates the likelihood of complex traits, such as height and intelligence, or diseases like diabetes, by summarizing data from thousands of genetic markers. However, many geneticists and bioethicists argue that PRS predictions lack clinical validity and promote eugenic practices that can prioritize socially desirable characteristics. They believe this approach risks reinforcing societal biases that may not be realistic and limits the autonomy and identity of the child as it restricts their life within a framework of genetic predictions. A 2021 study found that PRS explains only 5-10% of variance in educational attainment, highlighting its limited predictive ability.

== Pre-implantation Genetic Testing ==
Based on the specific analysis conducted:

PGT-M (Preimplantation Genetic Testing for monogenic diseases) is a technique used during IVF to detect hereditary diseases caused by mutations or alterations of the DNA sequence with a single gene.

PGT-A (Preimplantation Genetic Testing for aneuploidy): It is used to diagnose numerical abnormalities (aneuploidies).

== Human germline engineering ==
Human germline engineering is a process in which the human genome is edited within a germ cell, such as a sperm cell or oocyte (causing heritable changes), or in the zygote or embryo following fertilization. Germline engineering results in changes in the genome being incorporated into every cell in the body of the offspring (or of the individual following embryonic germline engineering). This process differs from somatic cell engineering, which does not result in heritable changes. Most human germline editing is performed on individual cells and non-viable embryos, which are destroyed at a very early stage of development. In November 2018, however, a Chinese scientist, He Jiankui, announced that he had created the first human germline genetically edited babies.

Genetic engineering relies on a knowledge of human genetic information, made possible by research such as the Human Genome Project, which identified the position and function of all the genes in the human genome. As of 2019, high-throughput sequencing methods allow genome sequencing to be conducted very rapidly, making the technology widely available to researchers.

Germline modification is typically accomplished through techniques which incorporate a new gene into the genome of the embryo or germ cell in a specific location. This can be achieved by introducing the desired DNA directly to the cell for it to be incorporated, or by replacing a gene with one of interest. These techniques can also be used to remove or disrupt unwanted genes, such as ones containing mutated sequences.

Whilst germline engineering has mostly been performed in mammals and other animals, research on human cells in vitro is becoming more common. Most commonly used in human cells are germline gene therapy and the engineered nuclease system CRISPR/Cas9.

=== Germline gene modification ===
Gene therapy is the delivery of a nucleic acid (usually DNA or RNA) into a cell as a pharmaceutical agent to treat disease. Most commonly it is carried out using a vector, which transports the nucleic acid (usually DNA encoding a therapeutic gene) into the target cell. A vector can transduce a desired copy of a gene into a specific location to be expressed as required. Alternatively, a transgene can be inserted to deliberately disrupt an unwanted or mutated gene, preventing transcription and translation of the faulty gene products to avoid a disease phenotype.

Gene therapy in patients is typically carried out on somatic cells in order to treat conditions such as some leukaemias and vascular diseases. Human germline gene therapy in contrast is restricted to in vitro experiments in some countries, whilst others prohibited it entirely, including Australia, Canada, Germany and Switzerland.

Whilst the National Institutes of Health in the US does not currently allow in utero germline gene transfer clinical trials, in vitro trials are permitted. The NIH guidelines state that further studies are required regarding the safety of gene transfer protocols before in utero research is considered, requiring current studies to provide demonstrable efficacy of the techniques in the laboratory. Research of this sort is currently using non-viable embryos to investigate the efficacy of germline gene therapy in treatment of disorders such as inherited mitochondrial diseases.

Gene transfer to cells is usually by vector delivery. Vectors are typically divided into two classes – viral and non-viral.

==== Viral vectors ====
Viruses infect cells by transducing their genetic material into a host's cell, using the host's cellular machinery to generate viral proteins needed for replication and proliferation. By modifying viruses and loading them with the therapeutic DNA or RNA of interest, it is possible to use these as a vector to provide delivery of the desired gene into the cell.

Retroviruses are some of the most commonly used viral vectors, as they not only introduce their genetic material into the host cell, but also copy it into the host's genome. In the context of gene therapy, this allows permanent integration of the gene of interest into the patient's own DNA, providing longer lasting effects.

Viral vectors work efficiently and are mostly safe but present with some complications, contributing to the stringency of regulation on gene therapy. Despite partial inactivation of viral vectors in gene therapy research, they can still be immunogenic and elicit an immune response. This can impede viral delivery of the gene of interest, as well as cause complications for the patient themselves when used clinically, especially in those who already have a serious genetic illness. Another difficulty is the possibility that some viruses will randomly integrate their nucleic acids into the genome, which can interrupt gene function and generate new mutations. This is a significant concern when considering germline gene therapy, due to the potential to generate new mutations in the embryo or offspring.

==== Non-viral vectors ====
Non-viral methods of nucleic acid transfection involved injecting a naked DNA plasmid into cell for incorporation into the genome. This method used to be relatively ineffective with low frequency of integration, however, efficiency has since greatly improved, using methods to enhance the delivery of the gene of interest into cells. Furthermore, non-viral vectors are simple to produce on a large scale and are not highly immunogenic.

Some non-viral methods are detailed below:

- Electroporation is a technique in which high voltage pulses are used to carry DNA into the target cell across the membrane. The method is believed to function due to the formation of pores across the membrane, but although these are temporary, electroporation results in a high rate of cell death which has limited its use. An improved version of this technology, electron-avalanche transfection, has since been developed, which involves shorter (microsecond) high voltage pulses which result in more effective DNA integration and less cellular damage.
- The gene gun is a physical method of DNA transfection, where a DNA plasmid is loaded onto a particle of heavy metal (usually gold) and loaded onto the 'gun'. The device generates a force to penetrate the cell membrane, allowing the DNA to enter whilst retaining the metal particle.
- Oligonucleotides are used as chemical vectors for gene therapy, often used to disrupt mutated DNA sequences to prevent their expression. Disruption in this way can be achieved by introduction of small RNA molecules, called siRNA, which signal cellular machinery to cleave the unwanted mRNA sequences to prevent their transcription. Another method utilises double-stranded oligonucleotides, which bind transcription factors required for transcription of the target gene. By competitively binding these transcription factors, the oligonucleotides can prevent the gene's expression.

=== ZFNs ===
Zinc-finger nucleases (ZFNs) are enzymes generated by fusing a zinc finger DNA-binding domain to a DNA-cleavage domain. Zinc finger recognizes between 9 and 18 bases of sequence. Thus by mixing those modules, it becomes easier to target any sequence researchers wish to alter ideally within complex genomes. A ZFN is a macromolecular complex formed by monomers in which each subunit contains a zinc domain and a FokI endonuclease domain. The FokI domains must dimerize for activities, thus narrowing target area by ensuring that two close DNA-binding events occurs.

The resulting cleavage event enables most genome-editing technologies to work. After a break is created, the cell seeks to repair it.

- A method is NHEJ, in which the cell polishes the two ends of broken DNA and seals them back together, often producing a frame shift.
- An alternative method is homology-directed repairs. The cell tries to fix the damage by using a copy of the sequence as a backup. By supplying their own template, researcher can have the system to insert a desired sequence instead.

The success of using ZFNs in gene therapy depends on the insertion of genes to the chromosomal target area without causing damage to the cell. Custom ZFNs offer an option in human cells for gene correction.

=== CRISPR/Cas9 ===
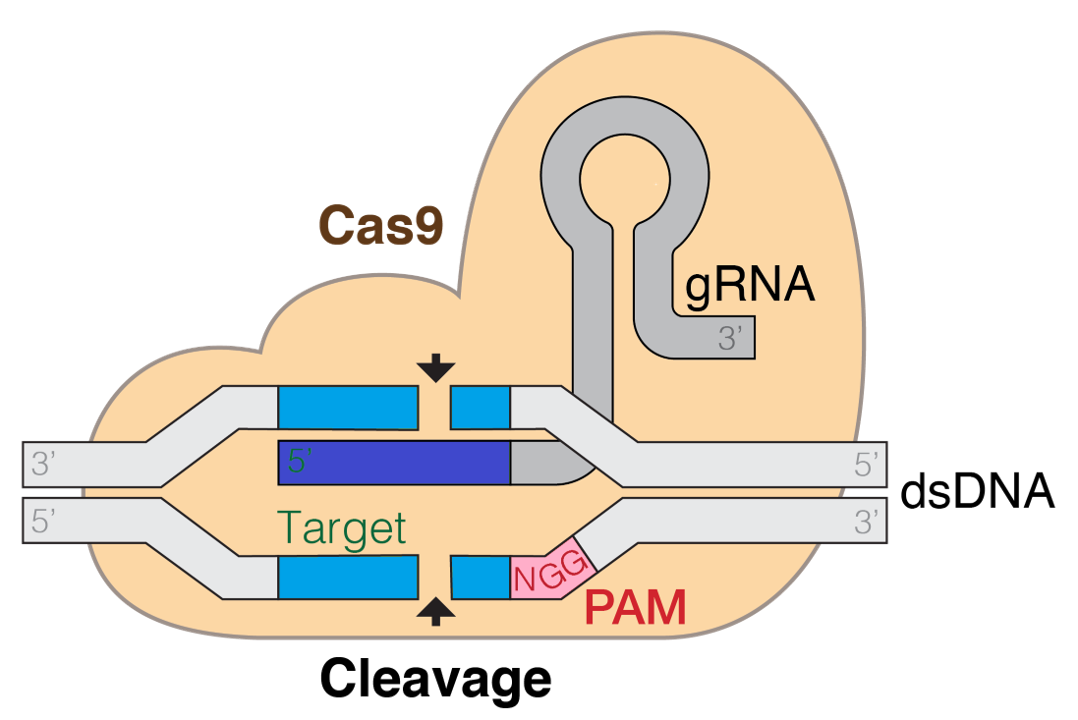
CRISPR-Cas9. PAM (Protospacer Adjacent Motif) is required for target binding.

The CRISPR/Cas9 system (CRISPR – Clustered Regularly Interspaced Short Palindromic Repeats, Cas9 – CRISPR-associated protein 9) is a genome editing technology based on the bacterial antiviral CRISPR/Cas system. The bacterial system has evolved to recognize viral nucleic acid sequences and cut these sequences upon recognition, damaging infecting viruses. The gene editing technology uses a simplified version of this process, manipulating the components of the bacterial system to allow location-specific gene editing.

The CRISPR/Cas9 system broadly consists of two major components – the Cas9 nuclease and a guide RNA (gRNA). The gRNA contains a Cas-binding sequence and a ~20 nucleotide spacer sequence, which is specific and complementary to the target sequence on the DNA of interest. Editing specificity can therefore be changed by modifying this spacer sequence.

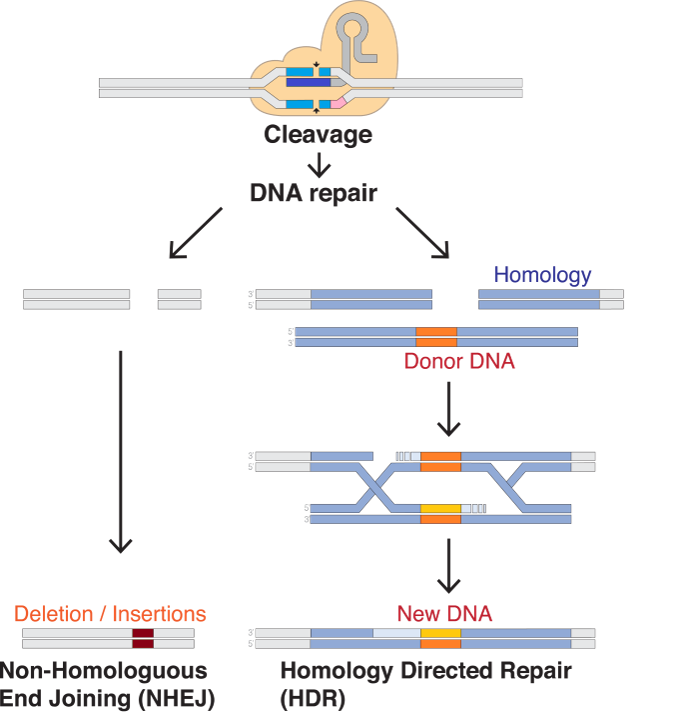
DNA repair after double-strand break

Upon system delivery to a cell, Cas9 and the gRNA bind, forming a ribonucleoprotein complex. This causes a conformational change in Cas9, allowing it to cleave DNA if the gRNA spacer sequence binds with sufficient homology to a particular sequence in the host genome. When the gRNA binds to the target sequence, Cas will cleave the locus, causing a double-strand break (DSB).

The resulting DSB can be repaired by one of two mechanisms –

- Non-Homologous End Joining (NHEJ) - an efficient but error-prone mechanism, which often introduces insertions and deletions (indels) at the DSB site. This means it is often used in knockout experiments to disrupt genes and introduce loss of function mutations.
- Homology Directed Repair (HDR) - a less efficient but high-fidelity process which is used to introduce precise modifications into the target sequence. The process requires adding a DNA repair template including a desired sequence, which the cell's machinery uses to repair the DSB, incorporating the sequence of interest into the genome.

Since NHEJ is more efficient than HDR, most DSBs will be repaired via NHEJ, introducing gene knockouts. To increase frequency of HDR, inhibiting genes associated with NHEJ and performing the process in particular cell cycle phases (primarily S and G2) appear effective.

CRISPR/Cas9 is an effective way of manipulating the genome in vivo in animals as well as in human cells in vitro, but some issues with the efficiency of delivery and editing mean that it is not considered safe for use in viable human embryos or the body's germ cells. As well as the higher efficiency of NHEJ making inadvertent knockouts likely, CRISPR can introduce DSBs to unintended parts of the genome, called off-target effects. These arise due to the spacer sequence of the gRNA conferring sufficient sequence homology to random loci in the genome, which can introduce random mutations throughout. If performed in germline cells, mutations could be introduced to all the cells of a developing embryo.

There are developments to prevent unintended consequences otherwise known as off-target effects due to gene editing. There is a race to develop new gene editing technologies that prevent off-target effects from occurring with some of the technologies being known as biased off-target detection, and Anti-CRISPR Proteins. For biased off-target effects detection, there are several tools to predict the locations where off-target effects may take place. Within the technology of biased off-target effects detection, there are two main models, Alignment Based Models that involve having the sequences of gRNA being aligned with sequences of genome, after which then the off-target locations are predicted. The second model is known as the Scoring-Based Model where each piece of gRNA is scored for their off-target effects in accordance with their positioning.

==== Regulation on CRISPR use ====
In 2015, the International Summit on Human Gene Editing was held in Washington D.C., hosted by scientists from China, the UK and the U.S. The summit concluded that genome editing of somatic cells using CRISPR and other genome editing tools would be allowed to proceed under FDA regulations, but human germline engineering would not be pursued.

In February 2016, scientists at the Francis Crick Institute in London were given a license permitting them to edit human embryos using CRISPR to investigate early development. Regulations were imposed to prevent the researchers from implanting the embryos and to ensure experiments were stopped and embryos destroyed after seven days.

In November 2018, Chinese scientist He Jiankui announced that he had performed the first germline engineering on viable human embryos, which have since been brought to term. The research claims received significant criticism, and Chinese authorities suspended He's research activity. Following the event, scientists and government bodies have called for more stringent regulations to be imposed on the use of CRISPR technology in embryos, with some calling for a global moratorium on germline genetic engineering. Chinese authorities have announced stricter controls will be imposed, with Communist Party general secretary Xi Jinping and government premier Li Keqiang calling for new gene-editing legislations to be introduced.

As of January 2020, germline genetic alterations are prohibited in 24 countries by law and also in 9 other countries by their guidelines. The Council of Europe's Convention on Human Rights and Biomedicine, also known as the Oviedo Convention, has stated in its article 13 "Interventions on the human genome" as follows: "An intervention seeking to modify the human genome may only be undertaken for preventive, diagnostic or therapeutic purposes and only if its aim is not to introduce any modification in the genome of any descendants". Nonetheless, wide public debate has emerged, targeting the fact that the Oviedo Convention Article 13 should be revisited and renewed, especially due to the fact that it was constructed in 1997 and may be out of date, given recent technological advancements in the field of genetic engineering.

In 2020, Canada amended its Human Reproduction Act to criminalize heritable genome edits, in which penalties include fines up to CAD$500,000 and 10 years imprisonment. The World Health Organization established a global registry for such practices in 2021 to enhance transparency

==== Recent Advancements ====
Following the 2018 incident of the first CRISPR-edited babies by He Jiankui, efforts to strengthen regulatory oversights have helped to improve the precision of the procedure. These advancements in genome editing now reduce off-target effects, allowing for more controlled and predictable modifications. Techniques such as prime editing and base editing have offered greater accuracy and fewer unintended mutations. Even so, ethical concerns persist as regulatory enforcement remains inconsistent in nations without strict biosafety laws

== Lulu and Nana controversy ==
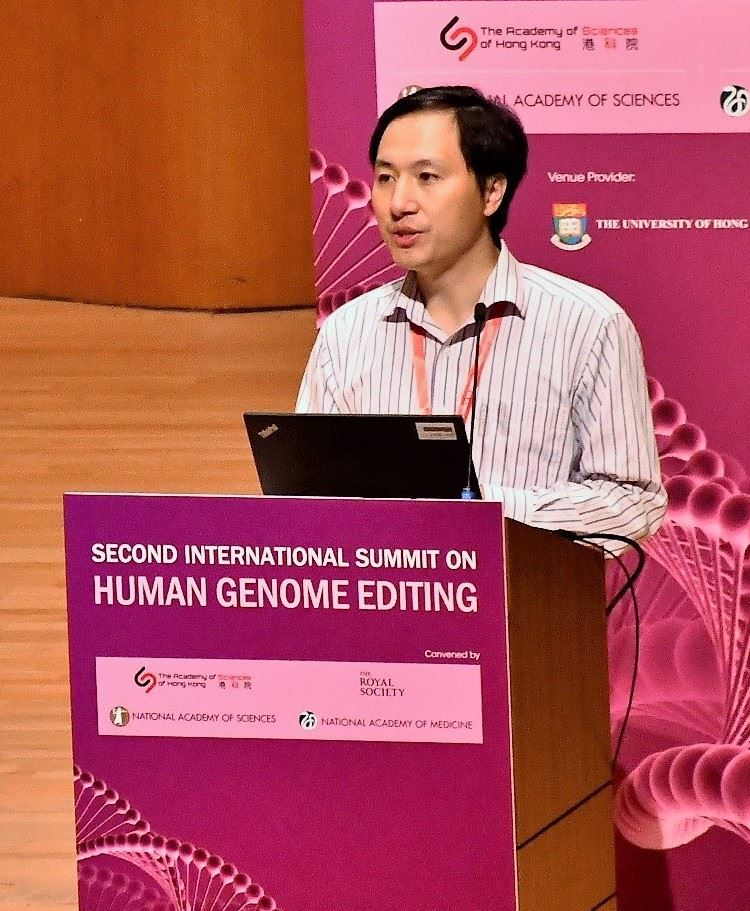
He Jiankui speaking at the Second International Summit on Human Genome Editing, November 2018

The Lulu and Nana controversy refers to the two Chinese twin girls born in November 2018, who had been genetically modified as embryos by the Chinese scientist He Jiankui. The twins are believed to be the first genetically modified babies. The girls' parents had participated in a clinical project run by He, which involved IVF, PGD and genome editing procedures in an attempt to edit the gene CCR5. CCR5 encodes a protein used by HIV to enter host cells, so by introducing a specific mutation into the gene CCR5 Δ32 He claimed that the process would confer innate resistance to HIV.

The project run by He recruited couples wanting children where the man was HIV-positive and the woman uninfected. During the project, He performed IVF with sperm and eggs from the couples and then introduced the CCR5 Δ32 mutation into the genomes of the embryos using CRISPR/Cas9. He then used PGD on the edited embryos during which he sequenced biopsied cells to identify whether the mutation had been successfully introduced. He reported some mosaicism in the embryos, whereby the mutation had integrated into some cells but not all, suggesting the offspring would not be entirely protected against HIV. He claimed that during the PGD and throughout the pregnancy, fetal DNA was sequenced to check for off-target errors introduced by the CRISPR/Cas9 technology, however the NIH released a statement in which they announced "the possibility of damaging off-target effects has not been satisfactorily explored". The girls were born in early November 2018, and were reported by He to be healthy.

His research was conducted in secret until November 2018, when documents were posted on the Chinese clinical trials registry and MIT Technology Review published a story about the project. Following this, He was interviewed by the Associated Press and presented his work on 27 November at the Second International Human Genome Editing Summit which was held in Hong Kong.

Although the information available about this experiment is relatively limited, it is deemed that the scientist erred against many ethical, social and moral rules but also China's guidelines and regulations, which prohibited germ-line genetic modifications in human embryos, while conducting this trial. From a technological point of view, the CRISPR/Cas9 technique is one of the most precise and least expensive methods of gene modification to this day, whereas there are still a number of limitations that keep the technique from being labelled as safe and efficient. During the First International Summit on Human Gene Editing in 2015 the participants agreed that a halt must be set on germline genetic alterations in clinical settings unless and until: "(1) the relevant safety and efficacy issues have been resolved, based on appropriate understanding and balancing of risks, potential benefits, and alternatives, and (2) there is broad societal consensus about the appropriateness of the proposed application". However, during the second International Summit in 2018 the topic was once again brought up by stating: "Progress over the last three years and the discussions at the current summit, however, suggest that it is time to define a rigorous, responsible translational pathway toward such trials". Inciting that the ethical and legal aspects should indeed be revisited G. Daley, representative of the summit's management and Dean of Harvard Medical School depicted Dr. He's experiment as "a wrong turn on the right path".

The experiment was met with widespread criticism and was very controversial, globally as well as in China. Several bioethicists, researchers and medical professionals have released statements condemning the research, including Nobel laureate David Baltimore who deemed the work "irresponsible" and one pioneer of the CRISPR/Cas9 technology, biochemist Jennifer Doudna at University of California, Berkeley. The director of the NIH, Francis S. Collins stated that the "medical necessity for inactivation of CCR5 in these infants is utterly unconvincing" and condemned He Jiankui and his research team for 'irresponsible work'. Other scientists, including geneticist George Church of Harvard University suggested gene editing for disease resistance was "justifiable" but expressed reservations regarding the conduct of He's work.

The Safe Genes program by DARPA has the goal to protect soldiers against gene editing war tactics. They receive information from ethical experts to better predict and understand future and current potential gene editing issues.

The World Health Organization has launched a global registry to track research on human genome editing, after a call to halt all work on genome editing.

The Chinese Academy of Medical Sciences responded to the controversy in the journal Lancet, condemning He for violating ethical guidelines documented by the government and emphasizing that germline engineering should not be performed for reproductive purposes. The academy ensured they would "issue further operational, technical and ethical guidelines as soon as possible" to impose tighter regulation on human embryo editing.

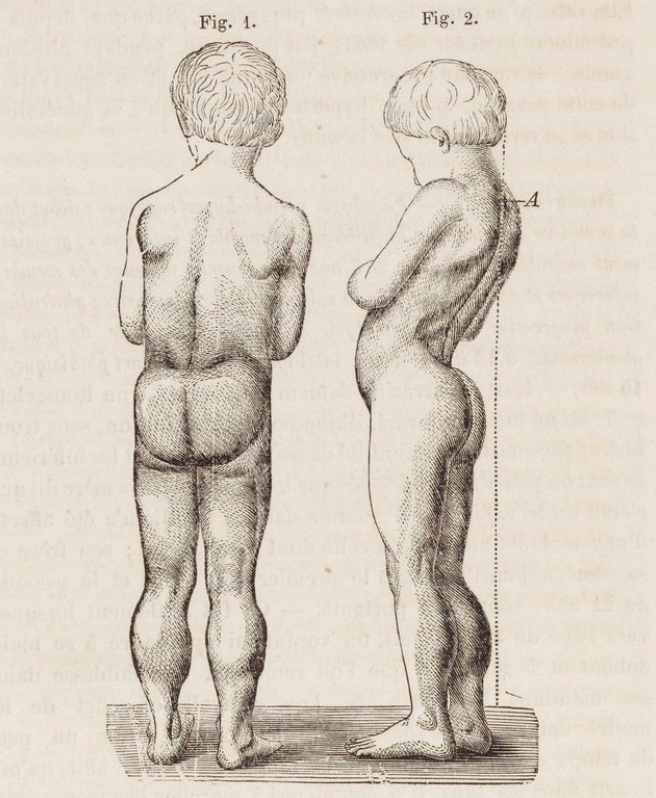
Illustration of seven-year-old boy with Duchenne muscular dystrophy, showing pseudohypertrophy of the lower limbs, thinness of the arms, and lumbar hyperlordosis.

As of 2023, He has resumed research in genetic medicine after his three year imprisonment by the Chinese government for his "illegal medical practices." He has since shifted his focus to the treatment of genetic diseases, including Duchenne muscular dystrophy (DMD), after his release. Despite backlashes from the Lulu and Nana case, he has been appointed as the inaugural director of the Genetic Medicine Institute at Wuchang University of Technology in Wuhan in September 2023. He's application to work in Hong Kong was initially granted a visa, however, it was later revoked due to ongoing ethical and legal challenges surrounding his career.

== Ethical considerations ==
Editing embryos, germ cells and the generation of designer babies is the subject of ethical debate, as a result of the implications in modifying genomic information in a heritable manner. This includes arguments over unbalanced gender selection and gamete selection.

Despite regulations set by individual countries' governing bodies, the absence of a standardized regulatory framework leads to frequent discourse in discussion of germline engineering among scientists, ethicists and the general public. Arthur Caplan, the head of the Division of Bioethics at New York University suggests that establishing an international group to set guidelines for the topic would greatly benefit global discussion and proposes instating "religious and ethics and legal leaders" to impose well-informed regulations.

In many countries, editing embryos and germline modification for reproductive use is illegal. As of 2017, the U.S. restricts the use of germline modification and the procedure is under heavy regulation by the FDA and NIH. The American National Academy of Sciences and National Academy of Medicine indicated they would provide qualified support for human germline editing "for serious conditions under stringent oversight", should safety and efficiency issues be addressed. In 2019, World Health Organization called human germline genome editing as "irresponsible".

Since genetic modification poses risk to any organism, researchers and medical professionals must give the prospect of germline engineering careful consideration. The main ethical concern is that these types of treatments will produce a change that can be passed down to future generations and therefore any error, known or unknown, will also be passed down and will affect the offspring. Theologian Ronald Green of Dartmouth College has raised concern that this could result in a decrease in genetic diversity and the accidental introduction of new diseases in the future.

When considering support for research into germline engineering, ethicists have often suggested that it can be considered unethical not to consider a technology that could improve the lives of children who would be born with congenital disorders. Geneticist George Church claims that he does not expect germline engineering to increase societal disadvantage, and recommends lowering costs and improving education surrounding the topic to dispel these views. He emphasizes that allowing germline engineering in children who would otherwise be born with congenital defects could save around 5% of babies from living with potentially avoidable diseases. Jackie Leach Scully, professor of social and bioethics at Newcastle University, acknowledges that the prospect of designer babies could leave those living with diseases and unable to afford the technology feeling marginalized and without medical support. However, Professor Leach Scully also suggests that germline editing provides the option for parents "to try and secure what they think is the best start in life" and does not believe it should be ruled out. Similarly, Nick Bostrom, an Oxford philosopher known for his work on the risks of artificial intelligence, proposed that "super-enhanced" individuals could "change the world through their creativity and discoveries, and through innovations that everyone else would use".

Many bioethicists emphasize that germline engineering is usually considered in the best interest of a child, therefore associated should be supported. Dr James Hughes, a bioethicist at Trinity College, Connecticut, suggests that the decision may not differ greatly from others made by parents which are well accepted – choosing with whom to have a child and using contraception to denote when a child is conceived. Julian Savulescu, a bioethicist and philosopher at Oxford University believes parents "should allow selection for non‐disease genes even if this maintains or increases social inequality", coining the term procreative beneficence to describe the idea that the children "expected to have the best life" should be selected. The Nuffield Council on Bioethics said in 2017 that there was "no reason to rule out" changing the DNA of a human embryo if performed in the child's interest, but stressed that this was only provided that it did not contribute to societal inequality. Furthermore, Nuffield Council in 2018 detailed applications, which would preserve equality and benefit humanity, such as elimination of hereditary disorders and adjusting to warmer climate. Philosopher and Director of Bioethics at non-profit Invincible Wellbeing David Pearce argues that "the question [of designer babies] comes down to an analysis of risk-reward ratios - and our basic ethical values, themselves shaped by our evolutionary past." According to Pearce,"it's worth recalling that each act of old-fashioned sexual reproduction is itself an untested genetic experiment", often compromising a child's wellbeing and pro-social capacities even if the child grows in a healthy environment. Pearce thinks that as technology matures, more people may find it unacceptable to rely on "genetic roulette of natural selection".

Conversely, several concerns have been raised regarding the possibility of generating designer babies, especially concerning the inefficiencies currently presented by the technologies. Green stated that although the technology was "unavoidably in our future", he foresaw "serious errors and health problems as unknown genetic side effects in 'edited' children" arise. Furthermore, Green warned against the possibility that "the well-to-do" could more easily access the technologies "..that make them even better off". This concern regarding germline editing exacerbating a societal and financial divide is shared amongst other researches, with the chair of the Nuffield Bioethics Council Professor Karen Yeung stressing that if funding of the procedures "were to exacerbate social injustice, in our view that would not be an ethical approach".

Since 2020, there have been discussions about American studies that use embryos without embryonic implantation with the CRISPR/Cas9 technique that had been modified with HDR (homology-directed repair), and the conclusions from the results were that gene editing technologies are currently not mature enough for real world use and that there is a need for more studies that generate safe results over a longer period of time.

An article in the journal Bioscience Reports discussed how health in terms of genetics is not straightforward and thus there should be extensive deliberation for operations involving gene editing when the technology gets mature enough for real world use, where all of the potential effects are known on a case-by-case basis to prevent undesired effects on the subject or patient being operated on.

Social aspects also raise concern, as highlighted by Josephine Quintavelle, director of Comment on Reproductive Ethics at Queen Mary University of London, who states that selecting children's traits is "turning parenthood into an unhealthy model of self-gratification rather than a relationship". In addition, some disability advocates argue that selecting against traits like deafness reinforces societal stigma. This promotes a narrow definition of normalcy. They also warn of the consequences of increased inequality if genetic enhancements become solely accessible to the wealthy.

One major worry among scientists, including Marcy Darnovsky at the Center for Genetics and Society in California, is that permitting germline engineering for correction of disease phenotypes is likely to lead to its use for cosmetic purposes and enhancement. Meanwhile, Henry Greely, a bioethicist at Stanford University in California, states that "almost everything you can accomplish by gene editing, you can accomplish by embryo selection", suggesting the risks undertaken by germline engineering may not be necessary. Alongside this, Greely emphasizes that the beliefs that genetic engineering will lead to enhancement are unfounded, and that claims that we will enhance intelligence and personality are far off – "we just don't know enough and are unlikely to for a long time – or maybe for ever".

=== Religious opinions ===
Religious worries also arise over the possibility of editing human embryos. In a survey conducted by the Pew Research Center, it was found that only a third of the Americans surveyed who identified as strongly Christian approved of germline editing. Catholic leaders are in the middle ground. This stance is because, according to Catholicism, a baby is a gift from God, and Catholics believe that people are created to be perfect in God's eyes. Thus, altering the genetic makeup of an infant is unnatural. In 1984, Pope John Paul II addressed that genetic manipulation in aiming to heal diseases is acceptable in the Church. He stated that it "will be considered in principle as desirable provided that it tends to the real promotion of the personal well-being of man, without harming his integrity or worsening his life conditions". However, it is unacceptable if designer babies are used to create a super/superior race including cloning humans. The Catholic Church rejects human cloning even if its purpose is to produce organs for therapeutic usage. The Vatican has stated that "The fundamental values connected with the techniques of artificial human procreation are two: the life of the human being called into existence and the special nature of the transmission of human life in marriage". According to them, it violates the dignity of the individual and is morally illicit.

In Islam, a positive view towards genetic engineering is based on the general principle that Islam aims at facilitating human life. However, according to Islamic law, gene editing can only be permitted if several conditions are met, such as definitively proving the safety and efficacy of the procedures in question. Nevertheless, some researchers consider genetic engineering a promising field of research that is capable of meeting the conditions mentioned above in the future. In addition, a negative view comes from the process used to create a designer baby. Oftentimes, it involves the destruction of some embryos, which may be against the teaching of the Qur'an, Hadith, and Shari'ah law, that stress the responsibility to protect human life. However, there is a consensus among Islamic scholars that ensoulment occurs 120 days after conception, well after the embryonic stage of development. Some scholars see the procedure as "acting like God/Allah" and a violation of the religious prohibition against "changing God's/Allah's creation". Other arguments include the possibility of introducing unforeseen mutations and genetic deficiencies, which would be counter to the principle of protecting human life, and undermining the traditional institutions of lineage, marriage and childbirth. With the idea that parents could choose the gender of their child, some Muslims believe that humans have no decision to choose the gender, and that "gender selection is only up to God".

=== Public opinion ===
Surveys of public attitudes towards designer babies and genetic editing have revealed concerns against the technological advancements, showing fears of eugenics and socioeconomic inequality. A 2018 Pew Research Center study found that 72% of the U.S. adults believed non-medical uses of the technologies would be taking it too far, with many drawing parallels to historical Eugenic practices. Similarly, a 2020 international survey published in the journal Science reported widespread public concern about the unintended health consequences of genetically modified children and the potential erosion of genetic diversity.

Scientists and policymakers have called for a more inclusive and transparent approach in regulation of the technologies, which underscores the need for collaborative governance frameworks and communication between scientists, policymakers, and the people.

== See also ==
- Biohappiness
- Directed evolution (transhumanism)
- Epidemiology of genetic disorder
- Eugenics
  - New eugenics
- Genetically modified organism
- Human enhancement
- Human genetic engineering
- Human germline engineering
- Lulu and Nana (Gene edited babies in China 2018)
- Moral enhancement
- Reprogenetics
- Transhumanism
