= Human germline engineering =

Process of editing the human genome so that the changes are inherited

Human germline engineering (HGE) is the process of modifying the genome of an individual in such a way that the change is heritable. This is achieved by editing genes in the germline, which are passed on to the next generation. HGE differs from current gene therapies, which only target somatic cells. Due to substantial ethical concerns, HGE is prohibited by law in more than 70 countries and by a binding international treaty of the Council of Europe.

In April 2015, a group of Chinese researchers used CRISPR/Cas9 to edit single-celled, non-viable embryos to assess its effectiveness. This attempt was unsuccessful; only a small fraction of the embryos successfully incorporated the genetic material and many of the embryos contained a large number of random mutations. The non-viable embryos that were used contained an extra set of chromosomes, which may have been problematic. In 2016, a similar study was performed in China on non-viable embryos with extra sets of chromosomes. This study showed similar results to the first; except that no embryos adopted the desired gene.

In November 2018, researcher He Jiankui created the first human babies from genetically edited embryos, known by their pseudonyms, Lulu and Nana. In May 2019, lawyers in China reported that regulations had been drafted providing that anyone who manipulated the human genome would be held responsible for any related adverse consequences.

== Techniques ==
=== CRISPR-Cas9 ===
The CRISPR-Cas9 system consists of an enzyme called Cas9 and a specialized piece of guide RNA (gRNA). Cas9 acts as a pair of 'molecular scissors' that can cut the DNA at a specific location in the genome so that genes can be added or removed. The guide RNA has complementary bases to those at the target location, so it binds only there. Once bound, Cas9 makes a cut across both DNA strands allowing base pairs to be inserted/removed. Afterwards, the cell recognizes that the DNA is damaged and tries to repair it.

Although CRISPR/Cas9 can be used in humans, it is more commonly used in other species or cell culture systems, including in experiments to study genes potentially involved in human diseases.

== Speculative uses ==
Germline engineering is already in widespread use, particularly in agriculture. Human germline engineering has several potential applications, ranging from strictly medically beneficial to purely cosmetic. HGE could prevent future offspring from inheriting genetic disorders, or lower the risk of potential disease. In the case of He Jiankui, the babies were edited in an attempt to confer innate resistance to HIV by deactivating the CCR5 gene. In the first modified human embryo study, researchers attempted to edit the HBB gene; natural mutations in this gene can result in beta-thalassemia, a potentially fatal disease. Potential gene therapies for a patient with beta-thalassemia would alleviate or cure them of the disease by providing a functioning copy of the gene, but current forms of therapy would not allow for their children to inherit a copy; if the germline could be edited, this functioning HBB allele could be passed on to future generations. Other potential applications include modifications with less medical importance, such as improved eyesight, lessening of allergies, or increased cardiovascular function.

=== Designer babies ===
The decreasing cost of gene editing has led to the speculative demand for "designer babies," modified human embryos that would allow parents to deliberately select or introduce desired traits in their children. The traits that could be selected for would not necessarily need to have medical beneficence, such as allowing for the selection of eye or hair color, height, or the appearance of physical features. One of the biggest concerns raised by bioethicists over lessening restrictions on human germline engineering is its potential application towards eugenics.

In a 2019 animal study with pigs, precise editing of the regulatory protein myostatin yielded increased muscle mass. The study mutated myostatin genes in 955 embryos at several locations with CRISPR/cas9, and implanted them into five surrogates, resulting in 16 piglets. Only specific mutations to the myostatin gene increased muscle mass, mainly due to an increase in muscle fibers. A similar mouse study knocked out the myostatin gene, which also increased muscle mass in the subjects. These studies showed that muscle mass could be increased with germline editing, and the same techniques could be applicable to humans where the myostatin gene serves the same function. Greater muscle mass is an example of a trait that could be considered desirable in those looking to select designer babies.

== Research ==
HGE is widely debated, and more than 40 countries formally outlaw it. No legislation explicitly prohibits germline engineering in the United States. The Consolidated Appropriation Act of 2016 bans the use of US FDA funds to engage in human germline modification research. In April 2015, a research team published an unsuccessful experiment in which they used CRISPR to edit a gene that is associated with blood disease in non-living human embryos.

Researchers using CRISPR/Cas9 have run into issues when it comes to mammals due to their complex diploid cells. Studies in microorganisms have examined loss of function genetic screening. Some studies used mice as a subject. Because RNA processes differ between bacteria and mammalian cells, researchers have had difficulties coding for mRNA's translated data without RNA interference. Studies have successfully used a Cas9 nuclease with a single guide RNA to allow for larger knockout regions in mice.

=== Lack of international regulation ===
The lack of international regulation led researchers to attempt to create an international framework of ethical guidelines. The framework lacks the requisite international treaties for enforcement. At the first International Summit on Human Gene Editing in December 2015 researchers issued the first international guidelines. These guidelines allowed pre-clinical research into gene editing in human cells as long as the embryos were not used to implant pregnancy. Genetic alteration of somatic cells for therapeutic proposes was considered ethically acceptable in part because somatic cells cannot pass modifications to subsequent generations. However the lack of consensus and the risks of inaccurate editing led the conference to call for restraint on germline modifications.

On March 13, 2019 researchers Eric Lander, Françoise Baylis, Feng Zhang, Emmanuelle Charpentier, Paul Bergfrom and others called for a framework that did not foreclose any outcome, but included a voluntary pledge and a call for a coordinating body to monitor the HGE moratorium with an attempt to reach social consensus before furthering research. The World Health Organization announced on December 18, 2018 plans to convene an intentional committee on the topic.

=== He Jiankui ===
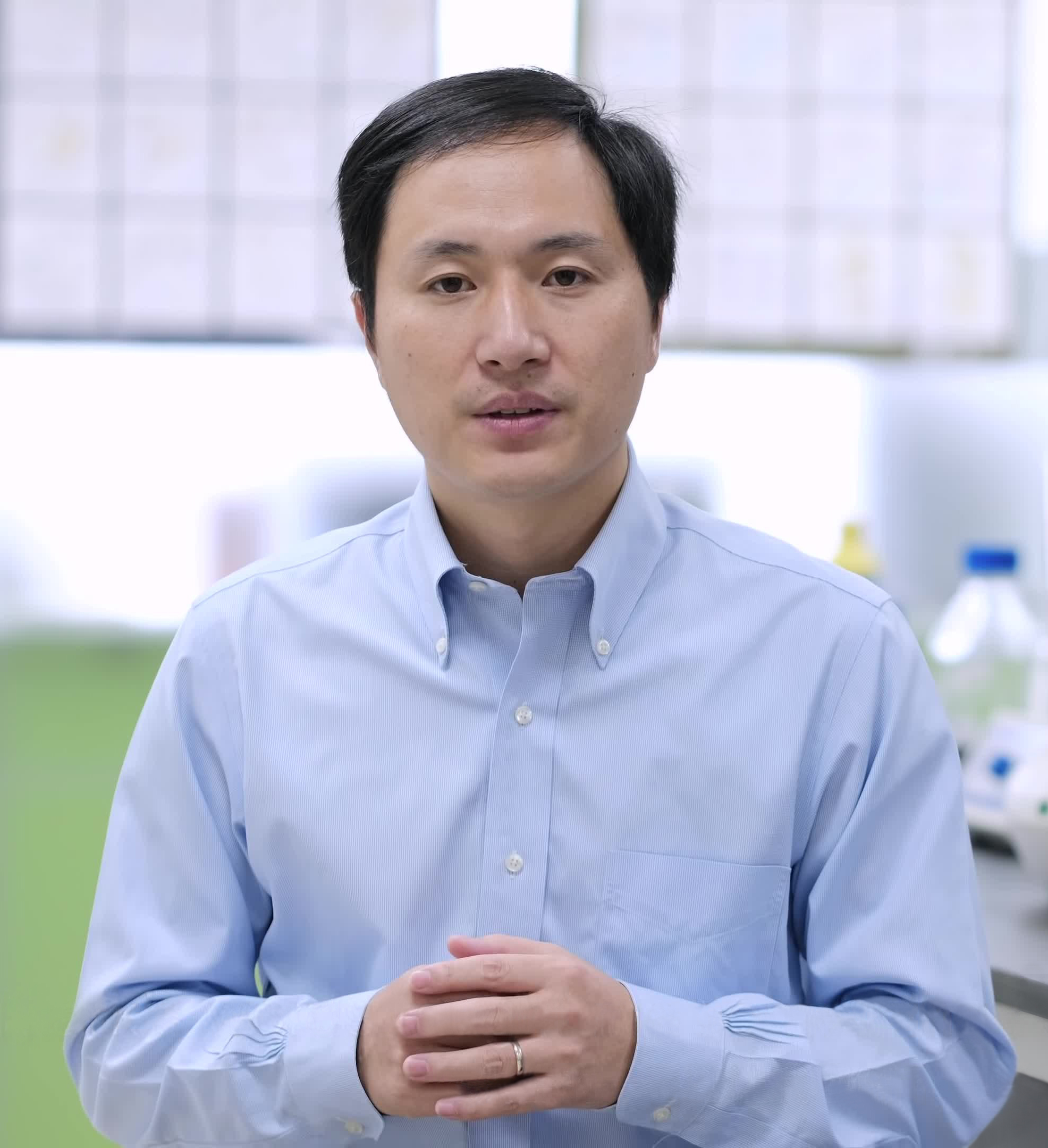
He Jiankui

The He Jiankui affair is a scientific and bioethical controversy concerning the use of genome editing following its first use on humans by Chinese scientist He Jiankui, who edited the genomes of human embryos in 2018. He became widely known on 26 November 2018 after he announced that he had created the first human genetically edited babies. He was listed in Time magazine's 100 most influential people of 2019. The affair led to ethical and legal controversies, resulting in the indictment of He and two of his collaborators, Zhang Renli and Qin Jinzhou. He eventually received widespread international condemnation.

He Jiankui, working at the Southern University of Science and Technology (SUSTech) in Shenzhen, China, started a project to help people with HIV-related fertility problems, specifically involving HIV-positive fathers and HIV-negative mothers. The subjects were offered standard in vitro fertilisation services and in addition, use of CRISPR gene editing (CRISPR/Cas9), a technology for modifying DNA. The embryos' genomes were edited to inactivate the CCR5 gene in an attempt to confer genetic resistance to HIV. The clinical project was conducted secretly until 25 November 2018, when MIT Technology Review broke the story of the human experiment based on information from the Chinese clinical trials registry. Compelled by the situation, he immediately announced the birth of genome-edited babies in a series of five YouTube videos the same day. The first babies, known by their pseudonyms Lulu (露露) and Nana (娜娜), are twin girls born in October 2018, and the second birth and third baby born was in 2019, named Amy. He reported that the babies were born healthy.

His actions received widespread criticism, and included concern for the girls' well-being. After his presentation on the research at the Second International Summit on Human Genome Editing at the University of Hong Kong on 28 November 2018, Chinese authorities suspended his research activities the following day. On 30 December 2019, a Chinese district court found He Jiankui guilty of illegal practice of medicine, (Note: Equivalent to the crime of "practicing without a license" in many other jurisdictions.) sentencing him to three years in prison with a fine of 3 million yuan. Zhang and Qin received an 18-month prison sentence and a 500,000-yuan fine, and were banned from working in assisted reproductive technology for life.

He Jiankui has been panned as a mad scientist. The impact of human gene editing on resistance to HIV infection and other body functions in experimental infants remains controversial. The World Health Organization has issued three reports on the guidelines of human genome editing since 2019, and the Chinese government has prepared regulations since May 2019. In 2020, the National People's Congress of China passed Civil Code and an amendment to Criminal Law that prohibit human gene editing and cloning with no exceptions; according to the Criminal Law, violators will be held criminally liable, with a maximum sentence of seven years in prison in serious cases.

=== Major studies ===
- The first known HGE research was by Chinese researchers in April 2015 in Protein and Cell. The researchers used tripronuclear (3PN) zygotes fertilized by two sperm and therefore non-viable, to investigate CRISPR/Cas9-mediated gene editing in human cells. The researchers found that while CRISPR/Cas9 could effectively cleave the β-globin gene (HBB), the efficiency of homologous recombination directed repair of CRISPR/Cas9 was inefficient and failed in a majority of trials. Problems arose such as off-target cleavage and the competitive recombination of the endogenous delta-globin with CRISPR/Cas9 led to unexpected mutation. The study results indicated that HBB repair in the embryos occurred preferentially through alternative pathways. In the end only 4 of the 54 zygotes carried the intended genetic information, and even then the successfully edited embryos were mosaics containing the preferential genetic code and the mutation.
- In March 2017, researchers claimed to have successfully edited three viable human embryos. The study showed that CRISPR/Cas9 is could effectively be used as a gene-editing tool in human 2PN zygotes, which could potentially lead to a viable pregnancy. The researchers used injection of Cas9 protein complexed with the relevant sgRNAs and homology donors into human embryos. The researchers found homologous recombination-mediated alteration in CRISPR/Cas9 and G6PD. The researchers also noted the limitations of their study and called for further research.
- An August 2017 study reported the successful use of CRISPR to edit out a mutation responsible for congenital heart disease. The study looked at heterozygous MYBPC3 mutation in human embryos. The study claimed precise CRISPR/Cas9 and homology-directed repair response with high accuracy and precision. By modifying the cell cycle stage at which the DSB was induced, they were able to avoid mosaicism in cleaving embryos, prominent in earlier studies, and achieve a large percentage of homozygous embryos carrying the wild-type MYBPC3 gene without evidence of unintended mutations. The researchers concluded that the technique may be used to correct mutations in human embryos. The claims of this study were however pushed back on by critics who argued the evidence was unpersuasive.
- A June 2018 study researchers reported a potential link for edited cells having increased cancerous potential. The study reported that CRISPR/Cas9 induced DNA damage response and stopped the cell cycle. The study was conducted in human retinal pigment epithelial cells, and the use of CRISPR led to a selection against cells with a functional p53 pathway. The study concluded that p53 inhibition might increase HGE efficiency and that p53 function would need to be watched when developing CRISPR/Cas9 based therapy.
- A November 2018 study of using CRISPR/Cas9 to correct a single mistaken amino acid in 16 out of 18 attempts in a human embryo. The unusual level of precision was achieved with a base editor (BE) system that was constructed by fusing the deaminase to the dCas9 protein. The BE system efficiently edited the targeted C to T or G to A without the use of a donor and without DBS formation. The study focused on the FBN1 mutation that is causative for Marfan syndrome. The study supported the corrective value of gene therapy for the FBN1 mutation in both somatic and germline cells.

== Ethical and moral concerns ==
As early in the history of biotechnology as 1990, there have been researchers opposed to attempts to modify the human germline using these new tools, and such concerns have continued as technology progressed. In March 2015, with the advent of new techniques like CRISPR, researchers urged a worldwide moratorium on clinical use of gene editing technologies to edit the human genome in a way that can be inherited. In April 2015, researchers reported results of basic research to edit the DNA of non-viable human embryos using CRISPR, creating controversy.

A committee of the American National Academy of Sciences and National Academy of Medicine gave support to human genome editing in 2017 once answers have been found to safety and efficiency problems "but only for serious conditions under stringent oversight." The American Medical Association's Council on Ethical and Judicial Affairs stated that "genetic interventions to enhance traits should be considered permissible only in severely restricted situations: (1) clear and meaningful benefits to the fetus or child; (2) no trade-off with other characteristics or traits; and (3) equal access to the genetic technology, irrespective of income or other socioeconomic characteristics."

Several religious positions have been published with regards to human germline engineering. According to them, many see germline modification as being more moral than the alternative, which would be either discarding of the embryo, or birth of a diseased human. The main conditions when it comes to whether or not it is morally and ethically acceptable lie within the intent of the modification, and the conditions in which the engineering is done.

Ethical claims about germline engineering include beliefs that every fetus has a right to remain genetically unmodified, that parents hold the right to genetically modify their offspring, and that every child has the right to be born free of preventable diseases. For parents, genetic engineering could be seen as another child enhancement technique to add to diet, exercise, education, training, cosmetics, and plastic surgery. Another theorist claims that moral concerns limit but do not prohibit germline engineering.

=== Consent ===
One issue related to human genome editing relates to the impact of the technology on future individuals whose genes are modified without their consent. Clinical ethics accepts the idea that parents are, almost always, the most appropriate surrogate medical decision makers for their children until the children develop their own autonomy and decision-making capacity. This is based on the assumption that, except under rare circumstances, parents have the most to lose or gain from a decision and will ultimately make decisions that reflects the future values and beliefs of their children. According to this assumption, it could be assumed that parents are the most appropriate decision makers for their future children as well. However, there are anecdotal reports of children and adults who disagree with the medical decisions made by a parent during pregnancy or early childhood, such as when death was a possible outcome. There are also published patient stories by individuals who feel that they would not wish to change or remove their own medical condition if given the choice and individuals who disagree with medical decisions made by their parents during childhood.

Other researchers and philosophers have noted that the issue of the lack of prior consent applies as well to individuals born via traditional sexual reproduction. Philosopher David Pearce further argues that "old-fashioned sexual reproduction is itself an untested genetic experiment", often compromising a child's wellbeing and pro-social capacities even if the child grows in a healthy environment. According to Pearce, "the question of [human germline engineering] comes down to an analysis of risk-reward ratios – and our basic ethical values, themselves shaped by our evolutionary past." Bioethicist Julian Savulescu in turn proposes the principle of procreative beneficence, according to which "couples (or single reproducers) should select the child, of the possible children they could have, who is expected to have the best life, or at least as good a life as the others, based on the relevant, available information". Some ethicists argue that the principle of procreative beneficence would justify or even require genetically enhancing one's children.

A relevant issue concerns "off target effects", large genomes may contain identical or homologous DNA sequences, and the enzyme complex CRISPR/Cas9 may unintentionally cleave these DNA sequences causing mutations that may lead to cell death. The mutations can cause important genes to be turned on or off, such as genetic anti-cancer mechanisms, that could speed up disease exasperation.

=== Unequal distribution of benefits ===
The other ethical concern is the potential for "designer babies", or the creation of humans with "perfect", or "desirable" traits. There is a debate as to if this is morally acceptable as well. Such debate ranges from the ethical obligation to use safe and efficient technology to prevent disease to seeing some actual benefit in genetic disabilities.

There are concerns that the introduction of desirable traits in a certain part of the population (instead of the entire population) could cause economic inequalities ("positional" good). However, this is not the case if a same desirable trait would be introduced over the entire population (similar to vaccines).

Another ethical concern pertains to potential unequal distribution of benefits, even in the case of genome editing being inexpensive. For example, corporations may be able to take unfair advantage of patent law or other ways of restricting access to genome editing and thereby may increase the inequalities. There are already disputes in the courts where CRISPR-Cas9 patents and access issues are being negotiated.

=== Therapeutic and non-therapeutic use ===
There remains debate on if the permissibility of human germline engineering for reproduction is dependent on the use, being either a therapeutic or non-therapeutic application. In a survey by the UK's Royal Society, 76% of participants in the UK supported therapeutic human germline engineering to prevent or correct disease, however for non-therapeutic edits such as enhancing intelligence or altering eye or hair color in embryos, there was only 40% and 31% support, respectively. There was a similar result in a study at the University of Bogota, Colombia, where students as well as professors generally agreed that therapeutic genome editing is acceptable, while non-therapeutic genome editing is not.

There is also debate on if there can be a defined distinction between therapeutic and non-therapeutic germline editing. An example would be if two embryos are predicted to grow up to be very short in height. Boy 1 will be short because of a mutation in his Human Growth Hormone gene, while boy 2 will be short because his parents are very short. Editing the embryo of boy 1 to make him of average height would be a therapeutic germline edit, while editing the embryo of boy 2 to be of average height would be a non-therapeutic germline edit. In both cases with no editing of the boys' genomes they would both grow up to be very short, which would decrease their wellbeing in life. Likewise editing both of the boys' genomes would allow them to grow up to be of average height. In this scenario, editing for the same phenotype for being of average height falls under both therapeutic and non-therapeutic germline engineering.

== Current global policy ==
There is a distinction in some country policies, including but not limited to official regulation and legislation, between human germline engineering for reproductive use and for laboratory research. As of October 2020, there are 96 countries that have policies involving the use of germline engineering in human cells.

=== Reproductive use ===
Reproductive use of human germline engineering involves implanting the edited embryo to be born. 70 countries currently explicitly prohibit the use of human germline engineering for use in reproduction, while 5 countries prohibit it for reproduction with exceptions. No countries permit the use of human germline engineering for reproduction.

Countries that explicitly prohibit any use of human germline engineering for reproduction are: Albania, Argentina, Australia, Austria, Bahrain, Belarus, Benin, Bosnia and Herzegovina, Brazil, Bulgaria, Burundi, Canada, Chile, China, Congo, Costa Rica, Croatia, Cyprus, Czech Republic, Denmark, Estonia, Finland, France, Georgia, Germany, Greece, Hungary, Iceland, India, Iran, Ireland, Israel, Japan, Kenya, Latvia, Lebanon, Lithuania, Malaysia, Malta, Mexico, Moldova, Montenegro, Netherlands, New Zealand, Nigeria, North Macedonia, Norway, Oman, Pakistan, Poland, Portugal, Qatar, Romania, Russia, San Marino, Saudi Arabia, Serbia, Slovakia, Slovenia, South Korea, Spain, Sweden, Switzerland, Thailand, Tunisia, Turkey, the United Kingdom, the United States, Uruguay, and the Vatican.

Countries that explicitly prohibit (with exceptions) the use of human germline engineering for reproduction are: Belgium, Colombia, Italy, Panama, and the United Arab Emirates.

=== Laboratory research ===
Laboratory research use involves human germline engineering restricted to in vitro use, where edited cells will not be implanted to be born. 19 countries currently explicitly prohibit any use of human germline engineering for in vitro use, while 4 prohibit it with exceptions, and 11 permit it.

Countries that explicitly prohibit any use of germline engineering for in vitro use are: Albania, Austria, Bahrain, Belarus, Brazil, Canada, Costa Rica, Croatia, Germany, Greece, Lebanon, Malaysia, Malta, Pakistan, Saudi Arabia, Sweden, Switzerland, Uruguay, and the Vatican

Countries that explicitly prohibit (with exceptions) the use of germline engineering for in vitro use are: Colombia, Finland, Italy, and Panama

Countries that explicitly permit the use of germline engineering for in vitro use are: Burundi, China, Congo, India, Iran, Ireland, Japan, Norway, Thailand, the United Kingdom, and the United States

== See also ==
- Human genetic engineering
- Gene therapy
- Germinal choice technology
- Human genetic enhancement
- CRISPR
- Designer Baby
