= Brian Earp =

American academic

Dr Brian David Earp
- Born: 1985 (age 40–41)
- Occupation: Philosopher, Cognitive Scientist, Bioethicist
- Education: Yale University, University of Oxford, University of Cambridge
- Notable works: Love Drugs: The Chemical Future of Relationships
- Notable awards: 2020 commendation by the John Maddox Prize judges

Website
- www.brianearp.com

Brian David Earp is an American bioethicist, philosopher, and interdisciplinary researcher. He is probably best known for his writings on bodily autonomy and integrity, the involuntary non-therapeutic (medically unnecessary) genital cutting of children and drug use in the United States. He is Director of the Oxford-National University of Singapore (NUS) Centre for Neuroethics and Society and the EARP Lab (Experimental Bioethics, Artificial Intelligence, and Relational Moral Psychology) within the Centre for Biomedical Ethics at the NUS Yong Loo Lin School of Medicine. Earp is an Associate Professor of Philosophy and of Psychology at NUS by courtesy. He is Associate Director of the Yale-Hastings Program in Ethics and Health Policy at Yale University and The Hastings Center. He is a Research Fellow at the Uehiro Oxford Institute. He is an elected member of the UK Young Academy under the auspices of the British Academy and the Royal Society.

Earp has written on a wide range of topics, including free will, sex and gender and the replication crisis in psychology. He has also worked on relational moral psychology, human enhancement, philosophy of love and children’s rights. Brian helped to establish "experimental philosophical bioethics" (bioXphi) as an area of research. He previously wrote the quarterly "Philosophy in the Real World" column for The Philosopher. In 2019, Earp wrote his first book (co-written with Julian Savulescu), published in the UK as Love Is the Drug: The Chemical Future of Our Relationships and in the United States as Love Drugs: The Chemical Future of Relationships).

He is Co-Editor-in-Chief of the Journal for Medical Ethics (JME) alongside Professor Lucy Frith (University of Manchester) and Associate Professor Arianne Shahvisi (Brighton and Sussex Medical School) and Editor-in-Chief of the inaugural open access companion journal to the JME, JME Practical Bioethics.

== Personal life ==
Earp grew up in a conservative evangelical Christian household. His mother was a stay-at-home mother; his father was an X-ray technician.

== Work and views ==
=== Relationships and drugs ===
He is best known for writing Love Is the Drug: The Chemical Future of Our Relationships with Julian Savulescu. He has argued that certain forms of medications can be ethically consumed as a "helpful complement" in relationships. Both to fall in love, and, to fall out of it.

=== Bodily autonomy and integrity, and children's rights ===
With other child genital cutting experts, Earp has argued that all forms of involuntary non-therapeutic (medically unnecessary) genital cutting or surgery — including penile circumcision, intersex interventions, and female genital mutilation — are violations of bioethical principles. For this work, Earp was nominated for the 2020 John Maddox Prize, and received commendation from the judges, for “taking a multi-disciplined, science-based approach to a deep-rooted cultural practice”.

A near ethical consensus in the Global North forbids clinicians to perform involuntary non-therapeutic genital cutting of endosex (non-intersex) female minors (except involuntary clitoral reduction surgeries on children with congenital adrenal hyperplasia), even pricking or nicking of the clitoral hood. For instance, these two are less severe than a endosex male circumcison: the partial or total removal of the penile prepuce of half of the motile skin system of the penis (approximately 30–50 cm2 in the adult organ).

Some advocates of the permissibility of medicalized newborn penile circumcision who recognize the physical and symbolic overlaps between this custom and what they see as “minor” female genital cutting (e.g., ritual cutting of the labia or clitoral hood) increasingly argue that the latter should be permitted in Western societies even for nonconsenting girls (i.e., for the sake of parity) overlaps between this custom and what they see as “minor” female genital cutting (e.g., ritual cutting of the labia or clitoral hood) increasingly argue that the latter should be permitted in Western societies even for nonconsenting girls (i.e., for the sake of parity) (Arora and Jacobs 2016; Cohen-Almagor 2020; Porat 2021; Shweder 2022b; for analysis, see Van Howe 2011). Nonvoluntary intersex surgeries have also in some cases been justified by appeals to the presumed acceptability of nonvoluntary penile circumcision (Fox and Thomson 2005; Meoded Danon 2018; see also Earp, Abdulcadir, and Shahvisi 2024).

With other child genital cutting experts, he asks that clinicians stop involuntary clitoral reduction surgeries on children with congenital adrenal hyperplasia (CAH), as well as the non-therapeutic genital cutting of endosex male minors and intersex children.

He is one of the authors of both statements made by the Brussels Collaboration on Bodily Integrity.

== Bibliography ==
- Earp, Brian D.; Savulescu, Brian D. (2020). Love is the Drug: The Chemical Future of Our Relationships. Manchester University Press. ISBN 978-1-5261-4541-3.
- Earp, Brian D.; Chambers, Clare; Watson, Lori, eds. (2022). The Routledge Handbook of Philosophy of Sex and Sexuality. Routledge. ISBN 9781138370678.
