= Richard Hayes =

Richard Hayes may refer to:

- Richard Hayes (1725-1790), Kent farmer whose history is described in A Yeoman of Kent by Ralph Arnold
- Richard J. Hayes (1902–1976), Irish World War II code breaker, & Director of National Library of Ireland
- Richard Hayes (professor) (born 1945), professor of Buddhist philosophy
- Richard Hayes (Irish politician) (1878–1958), Irish politician, historian, film censor and medical doctor
- Richard Hayes (Texas politician)
- Richard Hayes (biotech policy advocate), visiting scholar, University of California at Berkeley College of Natural Resources / Energy and Resources Group
- Richard Hayes (singer) (1930–2014), singer best known for his version of The Old Master Painter
- Richard Hayes (pilot), New Zealand helicopter pilot
- Richard Hayes (general), U.S. Army general
- Richard Hayes (priest) (died 1938), dean of Derry
- Rick Hayes (politician), American politician in Connecticut

== See also ==
- Rick Hayes-Roth (born 1947), professor in information sciences
- Richard Hays (disambiguation)
- Richard Hay (disambiguation)
