= Center for Genetics and Society =

US non-profit organization

The Center for Genetics and Society (CGS) is a non-profit information and public affairs organization based in Berkeley, California, United States. It encourages the responsible use and regulation of new human genetic and reproductive technologies. CGS provides analysis and educational materials and organizes conferences, workshops, and briefings. This organization tends to particularly criticize proposals concerning reproductive human cloning and germline genetic modification—both uses of technology colloquially considered 'socially irresponsible.'

CGS is a politically progressive and pro-choice organization. Its key areas of concern include: genetic modification of humans, stem cell research, DNA forensics, preimplantation genetic diagnosis, commercial and cross-border surrogacy, race and genetics, race-based medicines, egg retrieval, designer babies, human cloning, social sex selection, genetics and disability rights, direct-to-consumer genetic testing, human applications of synthetic biology, and the legacy of the U.S. eugenics movement.

The executive director of CGS is Marcy Darnovsky. The organization's advisory board includes Francine Coeytaux, Dorothy Roberts, Kavita Ramdas, Milton Reynolds, and Alexandra Stern. As of March 2023, CGS's current research fellows are Osagie Obasogie (Senior Fellow), Lisa Ikemoto, Gina Maranto, and Brendan Parent. Previously, Diane Beeson was a research fellow.

== History ==
The Center for Genetics and Society was founded in October 2001 under the leadership of Richard A. Hayes, Ph.D., to advocate for social oversight and control of new human biotechnologies. It drew from and continues to promote discussions and collaborations with key leaders in science, medicine, women's health, racial justice, disability rights, environmental justice, and human rights. A primary focus of the organization has been to alert civil society constituencies to the challenges posed by new human genetic technologies and assist them in discussions and debates about appropriate regulation.

CGS organizes and presents at key conferences and symposiums on national and international biopolitical issues; conducts briefings for interest groups and elected officials; engages in selected policy interventions; and has a media presence that includes publications, a blog, and social media.

In 2005, CGS received a "Local Heroes" award from the San Francisco Bay Guardian. In 2006, current Executive Director Marcy Darnovsky was named one of five "women in bioethics making a difference" by the Women's Bioethics Project.

== Policy interventions ==
- CGS has engaged with the U.S. Food and Drug Administration and the U.K. Department of Health and Human Fertilisation and Embryology Authority over proposals for human trials of a procedure that would produce inheritable genetic modifications, so-called "three-person IVF".
- CGS filed several amicus briefs in the lawsuit against Myriad Genetics concerning its breast-cancer gene patents. In June 2013, the Supreme Court ruled unanimously that naturally occurring human genes cannot be patented.
- CGS supported the 2006 bill SB 1260, which ensures that women in California who provide eggs for private research are accorded all established federal and state protections for human research subjects and limits reimbursement to their direct expenses.
  - It helped defeat the 2013 bill AB 926, which would have removed these provisions.
- CGS led in holding California's $3 billion stem cell research agency accountable to the state's legislature and the public. It submitted invited testimony to the "Little Hoover" Commission on California State Government Organization and Economy in 2008 and to the Institute of Medicine Committee in 2012, focusing on the conflicts of interest built into the agency's governing board.
- CGS was involved in the early stages of the 2000–2005 United Nations effort to propose an international treaty prohibiting human reproductive cloning.

== Funding ==
CGS is a project of the Tides Center, a 501(c)(3) organization funded by individual contributions and philanthropic foundations. CGS receives support from private donors and foundations and trusts, including the Appleton Foundation; Lyman B. Brainerd, Jr. Family Foundation, and the John D. and Catherine T. MacArthur Foundation.

== See also ==
- Bioethics
- Biopolitics
