= Richard Hays =

Richard Hays may refer to:

- Richard B. Hays (1948–2025), American academic
- Richard Hays (health sciences), Australian academic who at one time was a professor in England

== See also ==
- Richard Hayes (disambiguation)
- Richard Hay (disambiguation)
