= Richard Hay =

Richard Hay may refer to:

- Richard L. Hay (geologist) (1929–2006), American geologist
- Richard L. Hay (scenic designer) (born 1929), American scenic designer
- Richard Hay (politician) (born 1952), Indian politician

== See also ==
- Richard Hays (disambiguation)
- Richard Hayes (disambiguation)
