= Love Drugs =

Book

Love Drugs: The Chemical Future of Relationships, titled as such in the United States and as Love is the Drug: The Chemical Future of Our Relationships in the United Kingdom, is a 2020 book by Brian D. Earp and Julian Savulescu. It was published in the United States by Stanford University Press and in the United Kingdom by Manchester University Press.

The topic is drugs meant to promote or to suppress feelings of love, and ethical considerations around such. The book states that more research should be done in the field so that the drugs can be made safer, more predictable, and more likely for them to work. One point stated by the authors is that there are already drugs which have effects on sexual desire.

Ashley Fetters, in The Atlantic, wrote that the American title "evokes psychedelic, ’60s-era free love and Aldous Huxley’s Brave New World".

In 2023 a Dutch translation, Liefdesdrugs: De chemische toekomst van relaties, was released. This version, published by Pelckmans Uitgevers, has a different preface.
