= Human genetic enhancement =

Technologies to genetically improve human bodies

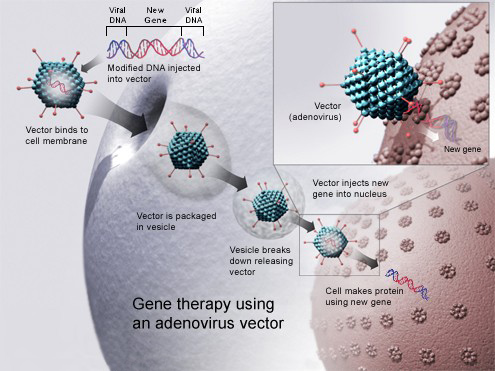
An illustration of viral vector-mediated gene transfer using an adenovirus as the vector

Human genetic enhancement, human genetic modification or human genetic engineering refers to human enhancement by means of a genetic modification. This could be done in order to cure diseases (gene therapy), prevent the possibility of getting a particular disease (similarly to vaccines), improve athlete performance in sporting events (gene doping), change physical appearance, metabolism, and even physical capabilities and mental faculties such as memory and intelligence.

These genetic enhancements can, in some cases, be heritable, which has raised ethical and regulatory concerns within the scientific community.

== Gene enhancement methods/tools ==
=== CRISPR/Cas9 ===
CRISPR/Cas9 is a genome editing technology that targets double-strand breaks in the human genome, modifying genes and providing a highly specific way to treat genetic disorders. Mammalian cells can be genetically modified to facilitate single-base exchanges, homology-directed repair, and non-homologous end joining. Since its development, it has created new opportunities to evaluate possible therapeutic strategies by disrupting coding sequences to silence deleterious proteins.

Example of Sickle Cell Anemia that could potentially be treated using CRISPR/Cas9

Despite recent progress, ensuring the editing precision and efficiency of CRISPR/Cas systems remains an obstacle, as unintentional off-target genetic changes may have unanticipated effects. There are currently ongoing clinical trials of CRISPR/Cas9 in treating various disorders, including sickle cell disease, human papillomavirus (HPV)-related cervical cancer, renal cell carcinoma, and multiple myeloma.

=== Homologous recombination ===
Homologous recombination began to be developed in the early 1970's when scientists observed that yeast and other organisms could preform it naturally. The process of Homologous recombinations includes the exchange of genetic material between similar DNA strands within a cell. In a lab, a piece of DNA that is similar to the one that needs to be edited must be isolated. The Isolated piece of DNA is then inserted into the cell where the gene exchange is to be made. Once the new piece of DNA is inside the cell, the new DNA can begin to combine with the cell's DNA, eventually fusing/replacing the two pieces of DNA.

Being one of the oldest methods, Homologous recombination is not a commonly used method for genetic enhancement. Its main limitation is its low success rate, which can sometimes be as low as one out of one million. Furthermore, homologous recombination can make unintended and incorrect edits. These occur when the inserted piece of DNA combines with a piece of DNA that was not the intended piece, these edits are called off-target edits.

=== Zinc-finger nucleases (ZFN) and Transcription activator-like effector nucleases (TALENs) ===
Zinc-finger nucleases (ZFN), developed in the 1990's, is a gene editing tool that involves the editing of proteins that occur in eukaryote organisms. These proteins are edited to bind to and target specific sequences in a genome. The engineered protein is then inserted, it binds to the target and cuts the DNA. This allows scientists to either delete or replace the cut segment of DNA. If the segment were to be replaced they would use homologous recombination. Similarly, Transcription activator-like effector nucleases (TALENSs) involves the modification of proteins that then cut existing DNA sequences. Developed in the 2000s TALENs is virtually the same as ZFN in terms of effectiveness and success, though TALENs is much easier to engineer than VFR.

Zinc-finger nucleases (ZFN) and Transcription activator-like effector nucleases (TALENSs) are two gene editing tools that were developed following Homologous recombination and before CRISPR. They are slightly more affective than Homologous recombination but not nearly as affective as CRISPR.

== Ethics ==
Genetic engineering has always been a topic of moral debate among bioethicists. The distinction between repairing genes (therapy) and enhancing genes is a central idea in many moral debates. Some argue that repairing genes is morally permissible, but that genetic enhancement is not, due to its potential to lead to social injustice and discriminatory eugenics initiatives.

Moral questions related to genetic testing often involve the duty to warn family members if an inherited disorder is discovered, the ethics of genetic discrimination, and the moral permissibility of using testing to avoid bringing seriously disabled persons into existence, such as through selective abortion. For example, Non-invasive prenatal testing (NIPT) can accurately determine the sex of a fetus as early as 7 weeks' gestation, raising concerns about the potential facilitation of sex-selective termination of pregnancy.

Technological advancements like CRISPR also present dilemmas regarding the long-term effects of altered organisms and the possibility of edited genes being passed down to succeeding generations (germline modification) with unanticipated effects. Conversely, proponents argue that major benefits are likely to develop from safe and effective human germline genetic modification (HGGM), making a strictly precautionary stance against HGGM unethical.

To navigate these complexities, researchers have advocated for robust regulatory frameworks. A group of scientists founded the Association for Responsible Research and Innovation in Genome Editing (ARRIGE) to provide guidance on the ethical use of genome editing. Additionally, bioethicists like Sheila Jasanoff have advocated for the establishment of an interdisciplinary "global observatory for gene regulation" to ensure debates are not controlled solely by the scientific community, bringing in perspectives that are often overlooked.

== Disease prevention ==
Gene editing holds potential for disease prevention by addressing genetic predispositions. Preimplantation genetic diagnosis allows for the whole genome amplification and analysis of embryos to select a healthy embryo for implantation, preventing the transmission of fatal metabolic disorders within families.

The CRISPR/Cas9 system is also being explored to prevent viral infections. In November 2018, Chinese scientist He Jiankui announced the creation of Lulu and Nana, the first genetically edited human babies. He utilized CRISPR-Cas9 to disable the CCR5 gene in the embryos, attempting to close the protein doorway that allows HIV to enter cells, thereby making the subjects immune to the virus. The experiment was met with widespread international condemnation.

CRISPR technology has also demonstrated efficacy in targeting viral infections like HSV-1, EBV, HIV-1, HBV, HPV, and HCV, with ongoing clinical trials for an HIV-clearing strategy named EBT-101. Additionally, researchers are developing new, gentler gene editing methods for embryos using nanoparticles and peptide nucleic acids, which have successfully corrected genes in mice without the need for harsh injections.

== Disease treatment ==
=== Gene therapy ===
Modification of human genes in order to treat genetic diseases is referred to as gene therapy. Between 1989 and December 2018, over 2,900 clinical trials of gene therapies were conducted, with more than half of them in phase I. Since that time, many gene therapy-based drugs have become available, such as Zolgensma and Patisiran.

Example of a tumor cell that could potentially be treated with nanoparticles

Most approaches utilize viral vectors, such as adeno-associated viruses (AAVs), adenoviruses (AV) and lentiviruses (LV), for inserting or replacing transgenes in vivo or ex vivo. In 2023, bioorthogonal engineered virus-like nanoparticles were created that act similarly to viral vectors. These nanoparticles display strong and rapid binding capabilities to LDL receptors on cell surfaces, allowing them to enter cells efficiently and deliver genes to specific target areas, such as tumor and arthritic tissues.

Gene therapy holds promise for conditions like Cystic fibrosis (CF), a hereditary disease caused by mutations in the CFTR gene. The emergence of sophisticated technologies, including viral and non-viral vector transport, mRNA, and CRISPR/Cas9, has revitalized the area of CF gene therapy, aiming to deliver and sustain CFTR gene expression in the lungs.

== Gene doping ==
Athletes might adopt gene therapy technologies to improve their performance. While gene doping is not widely known to occur, multiple gene therapies possess enhancement effects. Critics claim that any therapeutic intervention for enhancement purposes compromises the ethical foundations of medicine and sports. The prohibition of gene doping in sports has been enforced since 2003 by the World Anti-Doping Agency (WADA).

Several genes—such as EPO, IGF1, VEGFA, GH, HIFs, PPARD, PCK1, and myostatins—are prominent choices for potential gene doping. Athletes might employ substances such as antibodies against myostatin or myostatin blockers to augment mass, facilitate muscle development, and enhance strength. However, the misuse of gene doping entails significant health risks, including cancer, viral infections, myocardial infarction, and autoimmune complications. Excessive muscle development can lead to conditions like hypertonic cardiomyopathy, and render bones and tendons more susceptible to injuries.

Scientists have developed various technologies for the detection of gene doping. Early techniques such as PCR proved imprecise due to their reliance on exon-exon junctions, allowing manipulation through misleading primers. More recent detection utilizes Next Generation Sequencing (NGS), which conducts in-depth analysis of DNA makeup compared to reference sequences from gene databases, making primer tampering much harder. A highly efficient gene doping analysis method developed in 2023, HiGDA (High-efficiency Gene Doping Analysis), employs CRISPR/deadCas9 technology for detection.

== Other uses ==
Hypothetical gene therapies could include changes to physical appearance, metabolism, mental faculties such as memory and intelligence, and overall well-being (such as increasing resistance to depression or relieving chronic pain).

=== Physical appearance ===
Some congenital disorders (such as those affecting the muscoskeletal system) may affect physical appearance and cause physical discomfort. Modifying the genes causing these congenital diseases may prevent these effects. Gene editing has been shown to induce diverse phenotypic changes; for example, CRISPR-Cas9 modifications targeting the Tyr gene in mice have altered non-defined aspects such as coat color without off-target effects. Changes in the myostatin gene can also significantly alter physical appearance.

=== Behavior ===
Since the 1990s, scientists have recognized the influence of genetics on behavioral traits such as intelligence. Individual behavioral differences can potentially be predicted through behavioral genomics. Behavior may theoretically be modified by genetic intervention. Research is ongoing regarding genes that may be partially responsible for selfishness (e.g. ruthlessness gene), aggression (e.g. warrior gene), and altruism.

Experimental animal models have demonstrated that it is possible to alter central nervous system gene expression, thereby modifying behavior. By targeting the expression of the aldehyde dehydrogenase gene (ALDH2), researchers have significantly altered alcohol-drinking behavior in rodents. Reduction of p11, a serotonin receptor binding protein, led to depression-like behavior in rodents, while restoration of the p11 gene expression reversed this behavior. Other studies have shown that the gene transfer of CBP improves cognitive deficits in an animal model of Alzheimer's dementia via increasing the expression of brain-derived neurotrophic factor.

Research also exists within genoeconomics, a field investigating whether a person's financial behavior could be traced to their DNA. As of 2015, results have been largely inconclusive with only minor correlations identified. Other studies examine genes like MAOA (Monoamine oxidase A), mutations in which can affect the release of hormones like serotonin and dopamine. Such mutations have been linked in some studies to mood states like aggression and irritability.

=== Military ===
In December 2020, then-Director of National Intelligence John Ratcliffe stated in an editorial for The Wall Street Journal that US intelligence indicated China had conducted human testing on People's Liberation Army soldiers with the aim of creating "biologically enhanced" soldiers. In 2022, the People's Liberation Army Academy of Military Sciences reported an experiment where military scientists inserted a gene from the tardigrade into human embryonic stem cells. This experiment aimed to explore enhancing soldiers' resistance to acute radiation syndrome.

CRISPR/Cas9 technologies have garnered attention for their potential applications in military contexts, such as providing protection from frostbite, reducing stress levels, and enhancing strength and endurance. The Defense Advanced Research Projects Agency (DARPA) is actively involved in researching these technologies, including a project aimed at engineering human cells to function as nutrient factories to optimize soldier resilience in challenging environments.

== Databases about potential modifications ==
Geneticist George Church has compiled a list of potential genetic modifications based on scientific studies for possibly advantageous traits. This list includes modifications for less need for sleep, cognition-related changes that protect against Alzheimer's disease, disease resistances, higher lean muscle mass, and enhanced learning abilities, along with some of the associated studies and potential negative effects.

== See also ==
- Biohappiness
- Crossbreeding
- Directed evolution (transhumanism)
- Designer baby
- Epigenetics
- Genetic screening
- Genetic factors of addiction
- Procreative beneficence
- New eugenics
- Life extension
