= Nikolaus Knoepffler =

German academic (born 1962)

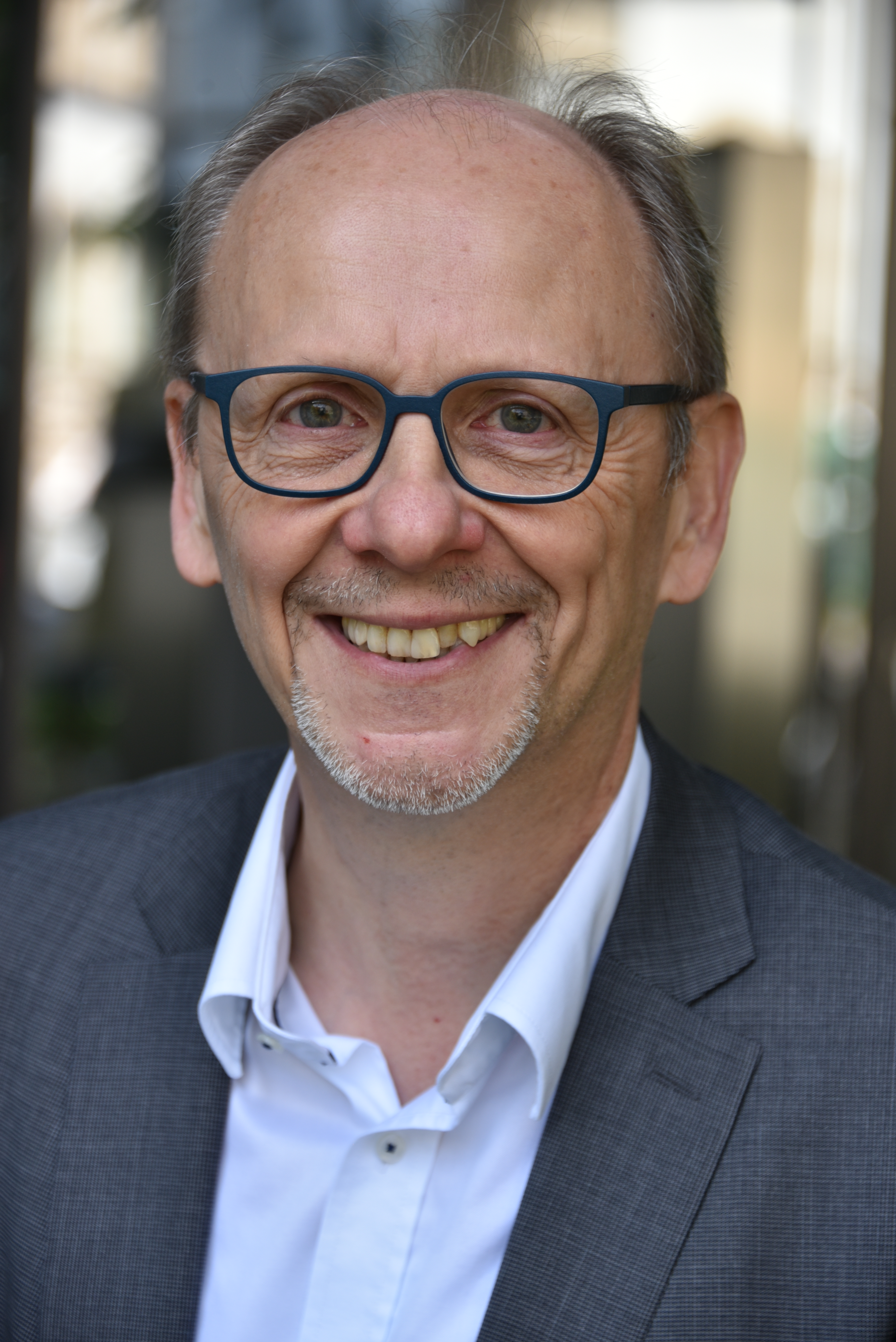
- Knoepffler in 2023
- Born: 1962 (age 63–64); Miltenberg, Bavaria
- Education: Pontifical Gregorian University, Leuphana University of Lüneburg, University of Bern
- Occupations: Philosopher and Theologian
- Title: Chair, Director, Founder, Professor

Nikolaus Knoepffler (born 1962 in Miltenberg, Bavaria) is a philosopher and theologian. He currently holds the Chair of Applied Ethics and is the director of the Ethics Center (Ethikzentrum) at the University of Jena, Germany. Knoepffler is founder and president of the Global Applied Ethics Institute, a consortium mainly involved with research on bioethics and business ethics. He is also Director of the Institute for the History, Theory and Ethics of Medicine.

== Life ==
Knoepffler studied philosophy and theology at the University of Würzburg and Sapienza University of Rome (1981–1990) where the Pontifical Gregorian University awarded him a licentiate in theology (1989), in philosophy (1990), and a doctorate in philosophy (1992). He was awarded the habilitation in 1998 as well as further doctorates in political science from the Leuphana University of Lüneburg and in theology from the University of Bern.

He was a fellow at the Institute of Technology - Theology - Natural Sciences (TTN) in Munich from 1996 to 2000, and was appointed Lecturer in Philosophy at LMU Munich in 1998. He then became deputy manager at TTN (2000–2002).

In 2002, he was a visiting professor at Georgetown University, Washington, DC. He was then appointed Professor of Applied Ethics at the University of Jena, where he also leads the Center of Applied Ethics (Ethikzentrum), the Department of Ethics in Sciences, and the Institute of History, Theory, and Ethics in Medicine.

He is president of the German Academy for Transplantation Medicine, and of the Global Applied Ethics Institute. From 2005 to 2019, Knoepffler was chair of the Ethics Commission of the Department of Social and Humanistic Studies, University of Jena. He is a member of the Bavarian Ethics Committee and the Preimplantation Genetic Diagnosis Commission at the Landesärztekammer Baden-Württemberg. From 2006 to 2013, he chaired the Graduate School on human dignity and human rights funded by the German Research Foundation (DFG). He was a principal investigator (2012–2018) in the trilateral project "Hearts of Flesh - not Stone", funded by the DFG, that included scholars from Israel, Palestine and Germany.

Knoepffler speaks in academic and popular contexts on topics related to his field of ethics. For example, he lectured at the “Wissensforum 2007” of the Süddeutsche Zeitung on the topic "Kant and the Stock Exchange." His research focuses on applied ethics, particularly medical and bioethics, human dignity and human rights, business ethics, research ethics and German philosophy, especially Kants.

== Research ==
Knoepffler's research focuses on the significance of human dignity in ethical conflict cases, as well as on questions of medical and business ethics.

In his monograph "Würde und Freiheit" (Dignity and Freedom), Knoepffler compares the concept of dignity found in the German Basic Law and the United Nations Declaration of Human Rights with the Christian and Kantian conceptions of dignity.

He highlights that the innovative character of the Human Rights Declaration and the Basic Law lies in the connection between dignity and rights. Christianity and Kant, by contrast, primarily associate dignity with duties. This comparison of conceptions of dignity and freedom also reveals why, in conflict cases at the beginning and end of life, in questions regarding the permissibility of the death penalty and torture, in debates about freedom of religion, expression, and conscience, in the handling of discrimination based on gender or sexual orientation, and in questions of appropriate asylum rights, the four conceptions do not lead to the same answers.

In his writings on medical ethics, Knoepffler advocates for an integrative medical ethics based on human dignity as a foundational principle. He combines insights from the Hippocratic ethos with the Four Principles approach of Beauchamp and Childress. His value-oriented business ethics is particularly inspired by the corporate reforms of Ernst Abbe in Jena.

In both medical and business ethics, Knoepffler works with the three-level model consisting of discourse, rule, and action levels. The aim is to understand that mere appeals to individual responsibility fall short when dealing with systemic problems such as sustainable business practices.

== Publications ==
- Würde und Freiheit: Vier Konzeptionen im Vergleich. 2. Auflage. Alber, Freiburg im Breisgau 2021 (Erstauflage 2018), ISBN 978-3-495-49249-9.
- Den Hippokratischen Eid neu denken: Medizinethik für die Praxis. Alber, Freiburg im Breisgau 2021, ISBN 978-3-495-49179-9.
- Schlüsselbegriffe der Philosophie Immanuel Kants: Transzendentalität und Menschenwürde, 2014
- Der Beginn der menschlichen Person, 2012
- Angewandte Ethik: Ein systematischer Leitfaden, 2010
- Der neue Mensch?: Enhancement und Genetik, 2009 (together with Julian Savulescu)
- Humanbiotechnology as a Social Challenge, 2007 (with Dagmar Schipanski and Stefan Lorenz Sorgner)
- Menschenwürde in der Bioethik, 2004
