= New eugenics =

Liberal use of reprogenetics in human enhancement

New eugenics, also known as liberal eugenics, advocates enhancing human characteristics and capacities through the use of reproductive technology and human genetic engineering. New eugenics purports to distinguish itself from the forms of eugenics practiced and advocated in the 20th century, which fell into disrepute after World War II.

New eugenics advocates generally think selecting or altering embryos should be left to the preferences of parents, rather than forbidden or left to the preferences of the state. Opponents argue that such practices may lead to increased social inequality and create new types of stigma against people with genetic traits deemed undesirable.

== New eugenics practices ==
Eugenics is sometimes broken into the categories of positive eugenics (encouraging reproduction among those designated "fit") and negative eugenics (discouraging or prohibiting reproduction among those designated "unfit"). Both positive and negative eugenic programs were advocated and pursued during the early 20th century. Negative programs were responsible for the compulsory sterilization of hundreds of thousands of persons in many countries and were a cornerstone of Nazi eugenic policies of racial hygiene which ultimately led to genocide.

New eugenics generally supports genetic modification or genetic selection of individuals for traits that are supposed to improve human welfare. The underlying idea is to improve the genetic basis of future generations by reducing the incidence of genetic diseases and other traits considered undesirable. Some of the practices included in new eugenics are prenatal testing, pre-implantation diagnosis and embryo selection, selective breeding, and human embryo engineering and gene therapy.

== Ethical status ==
Arguments used in favor of new eugenics include the claim that it is in the best interest of society that progeny have the best chance of achieving success as defined by that society. Ethical arguments against new eugenics include the claim that creating designer babies is not in the best interest of society, as it might create a breach between genetically modified individuals and natural individuals. Additionally, some of these technologies might be economically restrictive, further increasing the socio-economic gap.

The United Nations International Bioethics Committee wrote that the ethical status of new eugenics should not be conflated with that of 20th century eugenics movements. The committee states that new eugenics is problematic because it challenges the idea of human equality and opens up new ways of discrimination and stigmatization against those who do not want or cannot afford genetic enhancements.

== See also ==
- Biohappiness
- Directed evolution (transhumanism)
- Gattaca
- Mendelian inheritance
- Eugenics in France
