= Ronald Michael Green =

American theologian

Ronald Michael Green is an American theologian, currently Eunice and Julian Cohen Professor Emeritus for the Study of Ethics and Human Values Professor at Dartmouth College. Green graduated from Brown University before receiving his Ph.D. in Religious Ethics at Harvard University.
