= Marcy Darnovsky =

American policy advocate and author

Marcy Darnovsky (born August 4, 1951) is an American policy advocate and author who has extensively spoken and written on the politics of human biotechnology, focusing on their feminist, social justice, human rights, health equity, and public-interest implications. She completed her Ph.D. in the History of Consciousness program at the University of California, Santa Cruz, and is currently serving as the Executive Director at the Center for Genetics and Society. She is frequently cited by television, radio, and online sources.
