= Richard Hayes (biotech policy advocate) =

American environmentalist

Richard Hayes is visiting scholar at the University of California at Berkeley College of Natural Resources / Energy and Resources Group. He was founding executive director of the Berkeley, California-based Center for Genetics and Society, serving from 1999 through 2012. In the early 1990s he chaired the Sierra Club's Global Warming Campaign Committee. In the 1980s he served on the national staff of the Sierra Club, first as assistant political director and then as national director of volunteer development. He was previously executive director of the San Francisco Democratic Party.

According to Bill McKibben in 2004's Enough: Staying Human in an Engineered Age, Hayes is "one of the leading crusaders against germline manipulation," that is, the modification of inheritable human genetic traits. Hayes has briefed United Nations delegates on the need for a global ban on human cloning, and has testified in support of international oversight of human biotechnologies, and against the cloning of pets. He is quoted in a 2002 article in Newsweek International declaiming the "vacuum of leadership," regarding responsible oversight of human genetic technology, noting that "[t]hese technologies ... have developed so rapidly that there is not the type of structure to regulate them". He holds a PhD from Energy and Resources from the University of California at Berkeley.

== Selected speeches and publications ==
- "Genetic Engineering Limits—A Planet Responds", (2008-12-22) The Cutting Edge
- "Is There an Emerging International Consensus on the Proper Uses of the New Human Biotechnologies?" (2008-06-19) Testimony before the U.S. House Foreign Affairs Committee Subcommittee on Terrorism, Nonproliferation and Trade.
- "Our Biopolitical Future: Four Scenarios." 2007. World Watch
- "Stem Cells and Public Policy." (2006) The Century Foundation, New York, NY.
- Opening Remarks (2006) The American Association for the Advancement of Science Consultation on Human Enhancement.
- "Inequality, Democracy and the New Human Biotechnologies." (2004-06-15) The Century Foundation, New York, NY.
- "Inequality, the Environment, and the Human Future." (1994-05-21) Commencement Address, University of California, Berkeley, Energy and Resources.

== Sources ==
- Profile, Center for Genetics and Society.
