= Julian Savulescu =

Australian philosopher and bioethicist

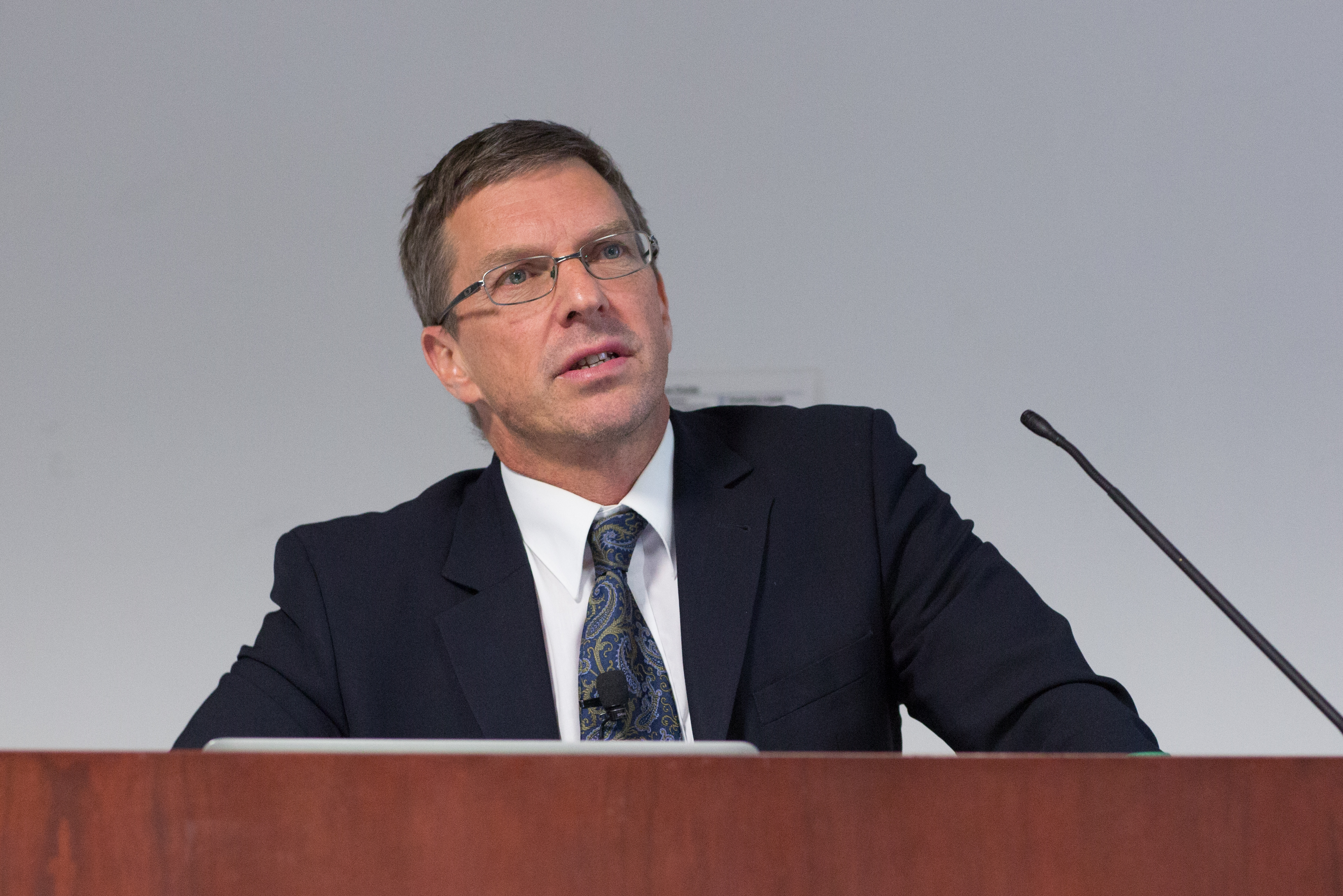
- Savulescu in 2015
- Born: 22 December 1963 (age 62); Melbourne, Victoria, Australia

Education
- Education: Monash University
- Doctoral advisor: Peter Singer

Philosophical work
- Era: Contemporary philosophy
- Region: Western philosophy
- School: Analytic philosophy
- Main interests: Ethics · Bioethics
- Notable ideas: Procreative beneficence

Julian Savulescu (/sævuːˈlɛskuː/ sav-oo-LES-koo; born 1963) is an Australian philosopher and bioethicist. He is Chen Su Lan Centennial Professor in Medical Ethics and Director of the Centre for Biomedical Ethics at the Yong Loo Lin School of Medicine, National University of Singapore and the Uehiro Chair in Practical Ethics at the University of Oxford. Savulescu founded the Oxford Uehiro Centre for Practical Ethics in 2003, which became the Uehiro Oxford Institute in 2024 following an endowment from the Uehiro Foundation on Ethics and Education. He is a former editor-in-chief of the Journal of Medical Ethics (2001-2004 and 2011–2018).

== Early life and education ==
Savulescu was born in Geelong, Australia. He attended Haileybury College in Melbourne on a full scholarship, and completed his medical training at Monash University, earning his Bachelor of Medicine and Bachelor of Surgery (MBBS). He also received a Bachelor of Medical Science (BMedSc).

Savulescu completed his Doctor of Philosophy (PhD) at Monash University under Peter Singer, with a thesis examining ethical issues in end-of-life care. From 1994 to 1997, he was a Sir Robert Menzies Medical Scholar at the University of Oxford, where he studied with Derek Parfit.

== Career ==
Before entering academia full-time, Savulescu practiced emergency medicine. He began his academic career as a Logan Research Fellow at Monash University from 1997 to 1998. From 1999 to 2002, Savulescu was a professor in the University of Melbourne Faculty of Medicine. During this period, he was also Director of the Ethics Program at the Murdoch Children's Research Institute.

In 2002, Savulescu was appointed to the Uehiro Chair in Practical Ethics at the University of Oxford, becoming the second holder of this position after Roger Crisp. In 2003, he founded the Oxford Uehiro Centre for Practical Ethics and held the position of Centre Director until 2022. He remains the Uehiro Chair in Practical Ethics (part-time).

In August 2022, Savulescu was appointed Chen Su Lan Centennial Professor in Medical Ethics at the National University of Singapore, where he also heads the Centre for Biomedical Ethics.

Savulescu is Distinguished Visiting Professorial Fellow at the Murdoch Children's Research Institute and Distinguished International Visiting Professor in Law at Melbourne Law School.

== Views ==
=== Procreative beneficence ===
Savulescu coined the term procreative beneficence. He describes it as the moral obligation (rather than mere permission) of parents who can select among potential children to choose those expected to have the best life prospects. For instance through preimplantation genetic diagnosis (PGD) and subsequent embryo selection or selective termination. A similar position was defended by John Harris. One argument is that some traits such as memory are "all-purpose means", in the sense of being instrumental in realizing whatever life plans the child may come to have.

Philosopher Walter Veit has argued that if one accepts both procreative beneficence and consequentialism, then a parental obligation for genetic enhancement logically follows, as there is no intrinsic moral difference between selecting and enhancing embryos for welfare-maximizing traits.

==== Reception ====
The principle of procreative beneficience is controversial. Bioethicist Rebecca Bennett argued against Savulescu's position, contending that not selecting the best offspring harms no one since those potential individuals would otherwise never have existed. She further wrote that the intuitions supporting such a selection merely reflect non-moral preferences rather than genuine moral obligations. Peter Herissone-Kelly argued against this criticism.

=== Moral enhancement ===
In 2009, Professor Savulescu presented a paper at the "Festival of Dangerous Ideas", held at the Sydney Opera House in October 2009, entitled "Unfit for Life: Genetically Enhance Humanity or Face Extinction", which can be seen on Vimeo. Savulescu argues that unless humans are willing to undergo "moral enhancement", they may be on the brink of disappearing in a metaphorical "Bermuda Triangle", which he describes as a dangerous convergence of three factors: widespread access to destructive technologies, inherent limitations of human moral nature (such as parochialism and self-interest), and inadequacies of liberal democracy to address global challenges.

Norbert Paulo criticised Savulescu's argument for moral enhancement, arguing that if democratic governments had to morally enhance their populations because the majoritarian population are morally deficient, they could not be legitimate as they manipulated the population's will. Thus in Paulo's view, those advocating large-scale, state-driven and partially mandatory moral enhancement are advocating a non-democratic order.

=== Embryonic stem cells ===
Savulescu also justifies the destruction of embryos and fetuses as a source of organs and tissue for transplantation to adults. In an abstract, he argues that "The most publicly justifiable application of human cloning, if there is one at all, is to provide self-compatible cells or tissues for medical use, especially transplantation. Some have argued that this raises no new ethical issues above those raised by any form of embryo experimentation. I argue that this research is less morally problematic than other embryo research. Indeed, it is not merely morally permissible but morally required that we employ cloning to produce embryos or fetuses for the sake of providing cells, tissues or even organs for therapy, followed by abortion of the embryo or fetus." He argues that if it is permissible to destroy foetuses, for social reasons, or no reasons at all, it must be justifiable to destroy them to save lives.

He argues that stem cell research is important enough as to be justifiable even if one conceptualizes the embryo as a person.

=== Abortion debate ===
Further, as editor of the Journal of Medical Ethics, he published, in 2012, an article by two Italian academics which stated that a new-born baby is effectively no different from a foetus, is not a "person" and, morally, could be killed at the decision of the parents etc. This article was published as part of a special double issue, "Abortion, Infanticide, and Allowing Babies to Die". The double issue included articles by Peter Singer, Michael Tooley, Jeff McMahan, C. A. J. Coady, Leslie Francis, John Finnis, and others. In an editorial, Savulescu wrote: "The Journal aims in this issue to promote further and more extensive rational debate concerning this controversial and important topic by providing a range of arguments from a variety of perspectives. We have tried to be as inclusive as possible and provided a double issue to include as many as possible of the submissions we received. Infanticide is an important issue and one worthy of scholarly attention because it touches on an area of concern that few societies have had the courage to tackle honestly and openly: euthanasia. We hope that the papers in this issue will stimulate ethical reflection on practices of euthanasia that are occurring and its proper justification and limits." He also stated, "I am strongly opposed to the legalisation of infanticide along the lines discussed by Giubilini and Minerva."

=== Other positions ===
Along with neuroethicist Guy Kahane, Savulescu's article "Brain Damage and the Moral Significance of Consciousness" argues that increased evidence of consciousness in patients diagnosed with being in persistent vegetative state actually supports withdrawing or withholding care.

== Books ==
He has co-authored two books: Medical Ethics and Law: The Core Curriculum with Tony Hope and Judith Hendrick and Unfit for the Future: The Need for Moral Enhancement (published by Oxford University Press) with Ingmar Persson.

He has also edited the books Der neue Mensch? Enhancement und Genetik (together with Nikolaus Knoepffler), Human Enhancement (together with Nick Bostrom), Enhancing Human Capacities, The Ethics of Human Enhancement. He was also a co-author of Love Is the Drug: The Chemical Future of Our Relationships addressing the future potential widespread use of aphrodisiacs. In it, he argued, that certain forms of medications can be ethically consumed as a "helpful complement" in relationships; both to fall in love and to fall out of it.

== Awards and recognition ==
Savulescu has an Honorary degree from the University of Bucharest (2014). He was elected a Fellow of the Academy of Medical Sciences in 2026.

== See also ==
- Biopolitics
- Designer baby
- Human enhancement
- Human genetic engineering
- Morphological freedom
- Techno-progressivism
- Transhumanism
