= Biohappiness =

Biological elevation of emotional well-being

Biohappiness, or bio-happiness, is the elevation of emotional well-being in humans and other animals through biological methods, including germline engineering through screening embryos with genes associated with a high level of happiness, or the use of drugs intended to raise positive neurochemicals and other biological indicators of happiness. The object is to facilitate the achievement of a state of "better than well".

Proponents of biohappiness include the transhumanist philosopher David Pearce, whose goal is to end the suffering of all sentient beings and the Canadian ethicist Mark Alan Walker. Walker coined the term "bio-happiness" to describe the idea of directly manipulating the biological roots of happiness in order to increase it. He sought to defend it on the grounds that happiness ought to be of interest to a wide range of moral theorists; and that hyperthymia, a state of high baseline happiness, is associated with better outcomes in health and human achievement.

== Potential risks ==
A significant danger of bio-happiness is the ethical problems of altering the natural human emotional state through technological methods. Molding organic brain chemistry or genetic structures to achieve happiness would raise concerns about the authenticity of the human body/experience. It is argued that tampering with the state of the human mind and creating an eternal happiness would disrupt the natural range of emotions that a human will experience. Sadness, grief and anger are all crucial for emotional growth, empathy and understanding. Additionally, the long term effects of bio-happiness are not yet understood, meaning later down the line, issues could arise. Loss of individuality, emotional depth and the risk of being dependent on an external source for happiness are all concerns regarding this.

== Current research and technologies ==
- Antidepressants are a short term form of biohappiness. Depending on the specific drug, they can either keep certain chemicals (i.e. serotonin or dopamine) active in the brain for longer, stop chemicals from breaking down, or increase the rate of chemical release. The acceptance of antidepressant use makes way for the normalization of technology use in mental health.
- Postmenopausal women with depression were given a questionnaire to determine their mood and to give a rating to how depressed they were feeling. The women then took a newly engineered neuroactive steroid geared towards the dampening of the GABA_{A} receptors. The women were then asked to repeat the questionnaire after the drug had kicked in and their average self reports showed a significant mood increase although no specific numbers were given as to by how much.
- Preimplantation genetic diagnosis and embryo profiling are both current technologies that could be used for biohappiness in the future.

== See also ==
- Eradication of suffering
- Experience machine
- Perfectionism (philosophy)
- Wireheading
